= Chapeltoun =

Estate in East Ayrshire, Scotland

Chapeltoun is an estate on the banks of the Annick Water in East Ayrshire, a rural area of Scotland famous for its milk and cheese production and the Ayrshire or Dunlop breed of cattle.

== Templeton and the Knights Templar ==
The feudal allocation of tenements to the vassals of the overlord, such as Hugh de Morville, was carried out very carefully, with the boundaries being walked and carefully recorded. The term 'ton' at this time was added to the site of the dwelling house, not necessarily a grand stone-built structure, which was bounded by a wall or fence. The tenements were held in a military tenure, the land being in exchange for military assistance to the overlord. In later years the military assistance could be exchanged for financial payment.

The name Templeton may have arisen due to lands here being given by the overlord to a vassal. The site of the original dwelling is unknown, Laigh Chapelton being the oldest known site of a habitation, probably dating from at least 1775.

The name Chapelton is relatively recent as Pont's Map of 1604 does not show such a place name; however, he does show a Templeton in approximately the right place between the Annick Water and the Glazert Water. Other Knights Templar temple-lands were to be found at the Templehouse and Fortalice in the old village of Darlington near Stewarton, Templehouse near Dunlop, at Templetounburn on the outskirts of Crookedholm and at several other places in the area, such as Temple-Ryburn and Temple-Hapland.

In 1312 the Knights Templar order, whose Scottish headquarters had been at Torphichen, was disbanded and its lands given to the Knights of St. John who today run the St John Ambulance amongst other activities. Lord Torphichen as preceptor obtained the temple-land tenements and the lands passed through the hands of Montgomerie of Hessilhead to Wallace of Cairnhill (now Carnell) in 1720, before passing out of the hands of the aristocracy. A tenement is a grant of land which has a building on it and is held in tenure by the tenant

The farms in the area used the Chapelton name in 1829 (Aitken) and Armstrong's 1775 map shows and names a Chapel. The name change from Templetoun to Chapelton may have resulted from the end of the official existence of the temple-lands sometime after 1720 or as a result of the breaking up of the ownership of these lands at around this date or possibly slightly earlier. Thus the name Templeton was in use in 1604 in 1654, but not by 1775 The will of Katherine Muir / Mure, dated 1665, relict of William Hepburn of Chapeltoun in the Parish of Stewarton, implies a change of name at an earlier date. This Chapeltoun may be the modern day Chapeltoun Mains.

Paterson (1866) states that on the lands of Langshaw (now Lainshaw) there was a chapel, dedicated to the Virgin Mary and that it had an appropriate endowment. After the Reformation the endowment was appropriated by the patron and the chapel allowed to fall into ruins. Temple-lands did not pay teins to maintain the local church and they were therefore a highly prized and lucrative asset.

In 1616 the patronage of the chapel and the lands of Peacock Bank (sic) were held by Sir Neil Montgomerie of Lainshaw as granted 'clare constat' by the Earl of Eglinton, but by 1661 the patronage was once again held directly by the Earl of Eglinton as indicated below. The site of the chapel was called Chapelton in the 17th century and Chapel by 1874. The same information is given by Paterson in 1866, Groome in 1885 and Barclay.

Etymology
The name Chapeltoun clearly derives from Chapel & Toun, indicating that a small settlement existed around the chapel in much the same way as many 'Kirktons' exist as at Kilmaurs-Glencairn and Stewarton kirks.

Dobie in 1876 records that Hugh, Earl of Eglinton inherited in May 1661 the 10 merkland of Langshaw with the patronage of the Chapel of the Blessed Virgin within these lands. A reference is made to a James Wyllie, whose family held these lands for several generations. This statement is made as part of a reference to the 5 merk lands of Gallaberry which were part of a larger area of land, most of which belonged to the estate of Dunlop. The name Gallaberry is thought to be derived from the Saxon word burgh and the Celtic word Gauls, the term meaning therefore the burgh, mansion or strength of the Gauls. Sanderson mentions a rural chapel dedicated to the Virgin Mother Mary located on the Lainshaw lands.

It is relevant here to note that Dobie lists three families with the name Tempiltoun in the Kilmaurs valuation role of 1640 while no other Cunninghame parishes have this name listed. One of the oldest graves in Kilmaurs-Glencairn churchyard, dating from the 17th century, is that of a Tempiltoun. The family Bible of the Templetons is held (2008) by the Forrests of Byres Farm, who are direct descendants.

== The Chapel and the Chapel Hill / Burial Mound / Moot Hill ==
Location of Chapeltoun, Ayrshire

Dobie states that two chapels existed, one at Lainshaw and one at Chapeltoun, however he may have confused the term 'attached' which can mean that it was on the land of or had been endowed by the owner or the Lord of the Barony, rather than necessarily being in close proximity to the castle/house of Lainshaw. If Patersons statement implying that only one chapel existed and that it was at Chapelton is correct, and he was brought up locally, then our knowledge of the history of the Chapel of St. Mary is greatly increased.

The Topographical Dictionary of Scotland in 1846 states that "About a mile from the town (Stewarton), on the farm of Chapelton (now Chapeltoun Mains), were recently dug up the foundations of an ancient chapel, of which however, no authentic records have been preserved."

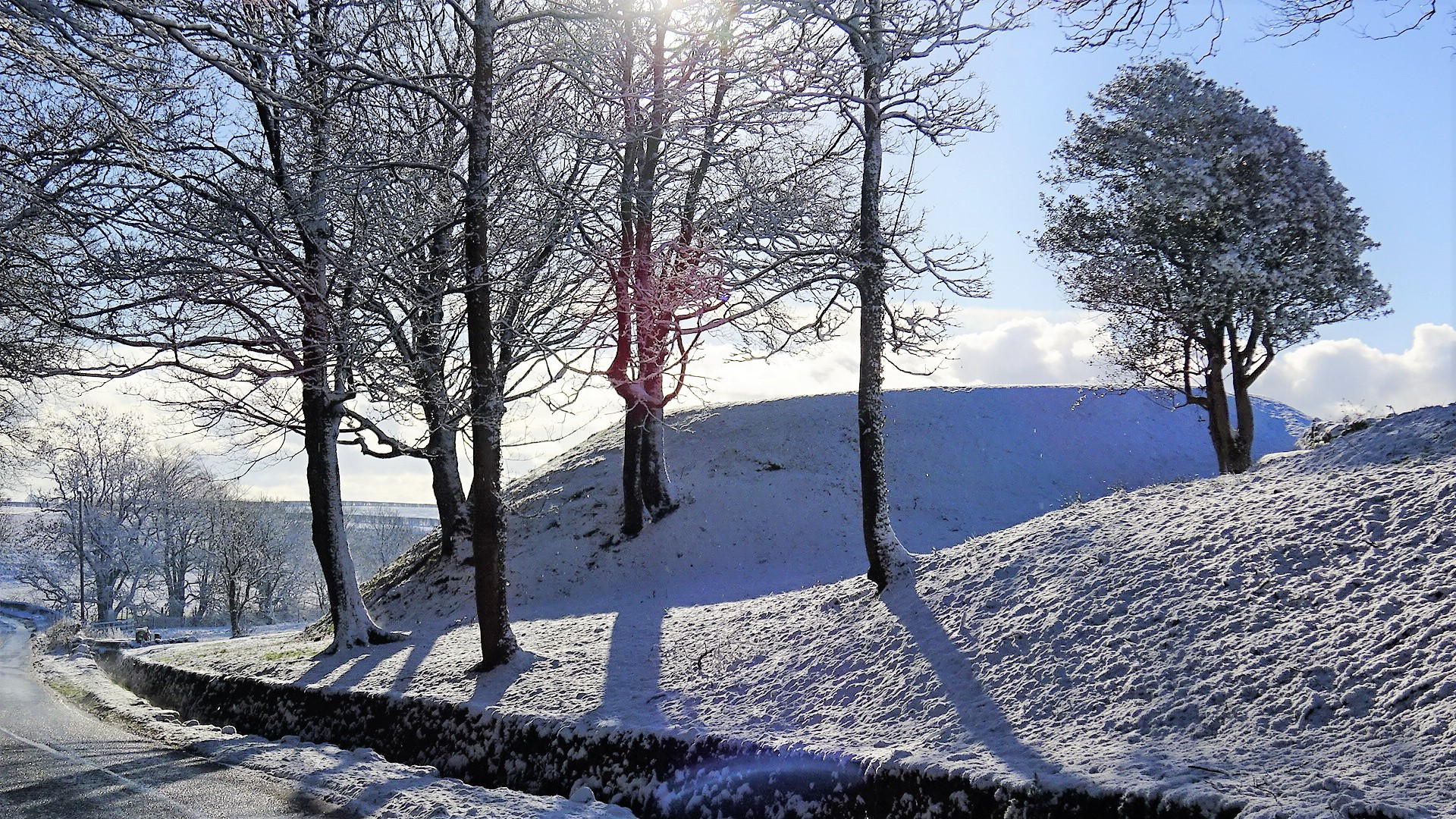
The Chapel Hill, Chapeltoun

In January 1678 Robert Cunynghame, druggist / apothecary / surgeon in Edinburgh, is stated to be the heir to Anne, daughter of Sir Robert Cunynghame of Auchenharvie. She was his cousin-german and part of the inheritance was 10 merk land of Fairlie-Crivoch, with the chapel lands and glebe of Fairlie-Crivoch. No other chapel is in the locality, so this most probably refers to the Chapel at Chapelton. He also owned much of the lands of Lambroughton. Crivoch was a barony and the lands had been split into Lindsay-Crevoch and Montgomerie-Crevoch. Fairlie Crevoch is probably the property close to the old Crivoch Mill at Kennox.

The chapel can never have been very large and was abandoned at the time of the Protestant reformation in Scotland led by the ex-Roman Catholic priest John Knox (1514 to 1572). It is not marked as a ruin on the 1775 Armstrong map, but as a small mansion house, implying that a Chapel House existed somewhere in the vicinity, in addition to the 1775 Laigh (possibly later named Chapelton). It has been stated that this site was just called 'chapel' at this time and this is the name given on Armstrong's map.

No evidence for the site of the priest's dwelling exists, however the site of the old Templeton/Chapelton House suggest itself. If the Laigh marked on the 1775 map refers to Laigh Chapelton then the antiquity of the site is further enhanced as it is the only other named site in the vicinity of the chapel.

The history of the monastic settlement and the chapel of Saint Mary at the Chapel Crags beside the Thugart stane/T'Ogra Stane/Thurgatstane/Thorgatstane/Field Spirit Stane/Ogrestane near Dunlop is a parallel example to the Chapel on the Chapel Hill. The pagan stone is still in existence, 13 feet (4.0 m) long, 10 feet (3.0 m) broad and 4 feet (1.2 m) high, but no evidence of the Christian sites is visible, apart from the inconspicuous Holy Well in the field bordered by the burn. Bayne states that the stone may have been a rocking or 'logan stone' at one time and it is recorded that the farmer was not permitted to plough within a set distance of the stone, presumably because of a tradition of pagan burials around this monument, which is a 'glacial erratic' in origin. It was still worshiped up until "the times of popery" according to McIntosh.

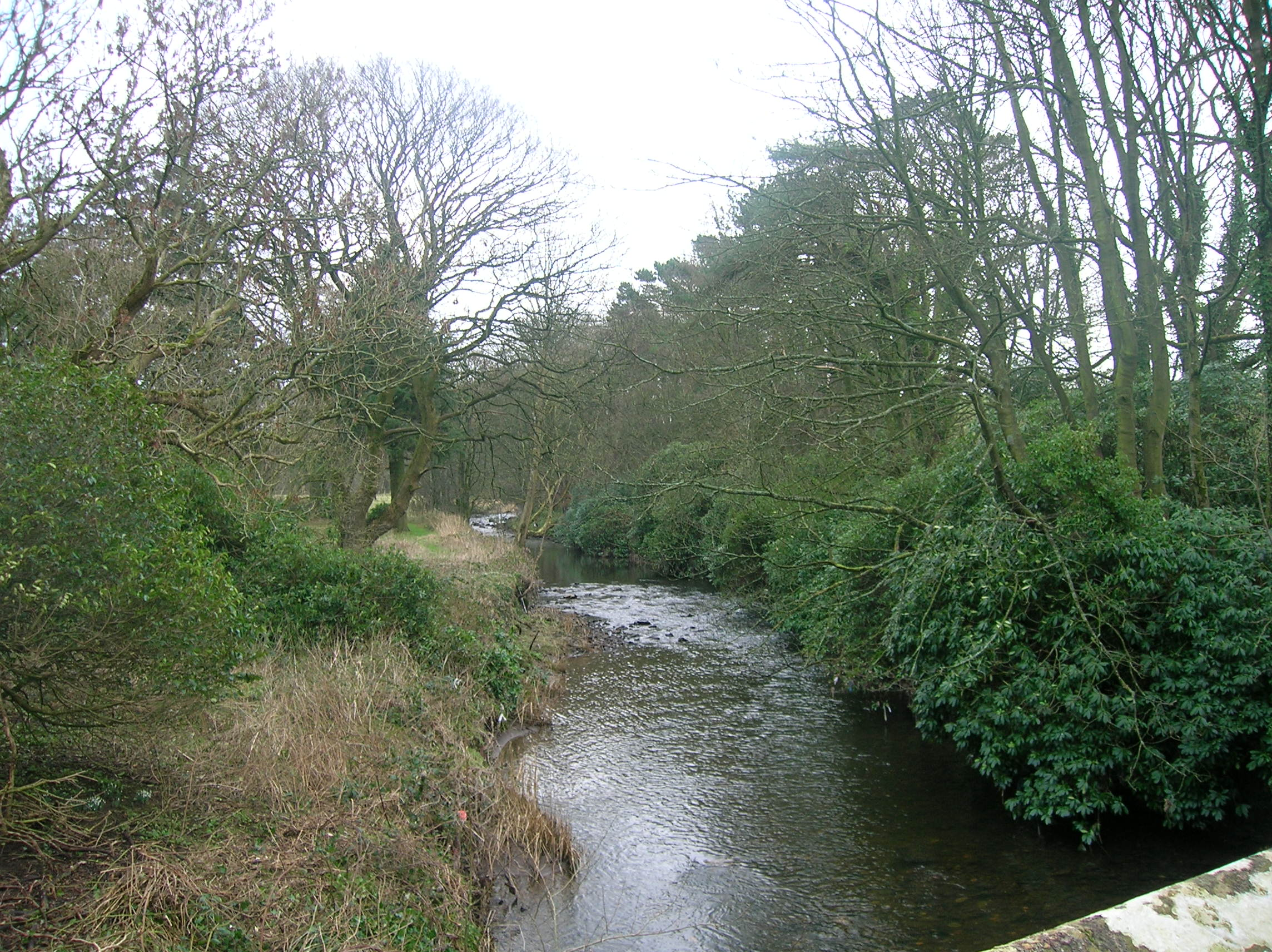
The Annick Water looking upstream from Chapeltoun Bridge.

The topography of the area is typical of the sort of site chosen for early ecclesiastical establishments and the building of chapels or churches on pagan sites is a classic example of the way that Christianity supplanted pagan beliefs and practices. Both these religious sites are also in sheltered valleys, with ample running water and they are hidden from view.

As stated the 1775 Armstrong map of Ayrshire clearly shows a 'Chapel' marked, so it was known to exist at this time, however the remains would have been mined/removed over the years by local farmers and used for building work, etc. The remains of the chapel would have been hard to locate by the early 18th century. Arrowsmith's 1807 map shows Chapel marked near Linshaw (Lainshaw) and no Laigh mentioned, while Ainslie's 1821 map shows a Chapel and a Laigh. It is likely that the term Chapel on most maps could be referring to a dwelling or farm and not the Chapel on the mound.

The 1856 'Name Book' of the OS states that part of the house of Chapelton (NS 395 441) is believed to have been a chapel dedicated to the Virgin Mary. Though parts of the building are of great age, it is not certain that this was the chapel; it may have been the residence of the chaplain, while the chapel stood near Chapel Hill. This Chapel Hill is a circular artificial hill. About 1850, Mr. J McAlister raised it to its present height by taking the earth etc. that had slid from its sides, and putting it on the top. While doing this, a quantity of human bones was found near the base on the S and E sides, and also some stones which from their appearance Mr. McAlister thought had been exposed to fire, suggesting that the old chapel was destroyed by fire. Mr. R Miller, a former proprietor, stated that when the present road past Chapel Hill was being made, a quantity of bones was found, giving the idea that there had been a burial ground here.

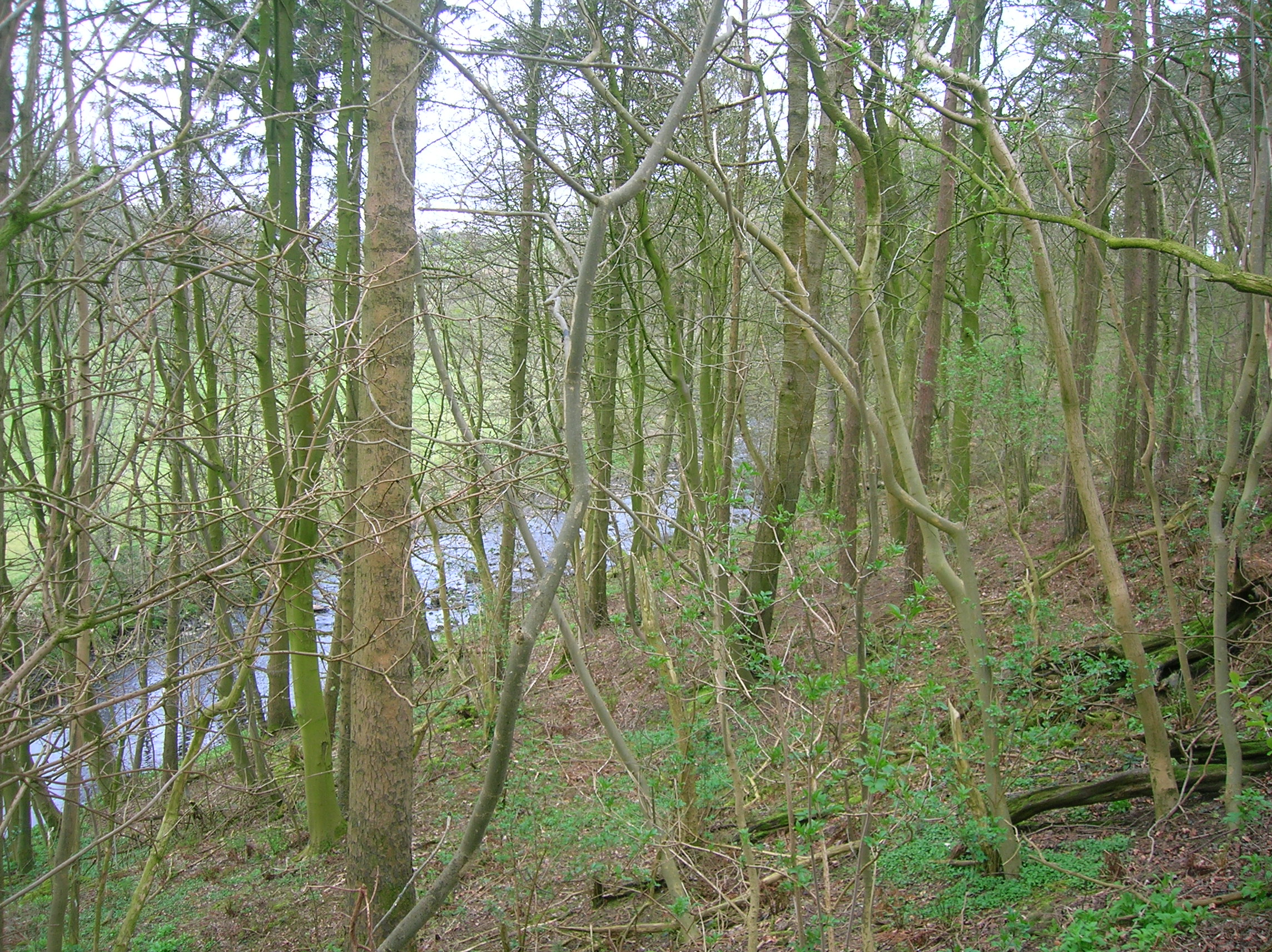
The Bonnie wood o' Lambroughton.

Smith, the well known antiquarian, in 1895 describes the mound as being 22 paces in diameter, 20 feet (6.1 m) high on the low side and 7 feet (2.1 m) high on the high side. He states that it is well cared for and that a flight of steps, not clearly visible today, ran up from its base to the top. However significantly he makes no reference to any remains of the chapel itself. The 1897 25" to the mile OS shows a path at the Chapelhill House side of the mound and a possibly a curving path or steps up. Smith also states that the mound was repaired some fifty years before, which fits in with the approximate dates for the likely construction of the Chapelton (old) house, by or for James McAlister who is given as the owner of Chapelton at around this time, and it is stated in 1874 that the chapel ruins were found some 40 years before, i.e. around 1834. The 1846 record states that they had been found recently however (Topo Dict Scot).

In 1842 it is recorded that "Near the farm house of Low Chapelton, above a mile below Stewarton, on the right bank of the Annock, there appears to have once been a chapel, the ruins of which were lately dug up, when the proprietor was engaged in planting trees. There are now no records remaining of the place of worship."

Fullarton records that ".. it derived its name from an ancient chapel which stood here, and some fragments of the walls of which still remain connected with this chaste and elegant cottage residence. The site is peculiarly monastic, in a finely sheltered depression close by the brink of the stream."

The Ardossan & Saltcoats Herald on 28.11.1863 ran an article that stated that: "The Chaplehill, an artificial mound, not unlike the one at Castleton, as large, (some people think larger) and of an equally perfect shape. A portion of one side had been thrown down in the last century, to form part of a private road; but when James McAllisiter, Esq., succeeded to the place, in 1847, he found the road had long been disused, and with good taste restored the hill to what had been its original form. In doing so, we believe, he found a good many bones, but not in coffins; and from their position had been evidently disturbed. A large quantity had been found on a former occasion. No very remote date is assigned to these remains. The place probably had been used as a Catholic Burying ground. There was also found a small portion of what seems to have been a clay urn; also, two very ancient copper coins, so ancient indeed, that it is impossible to make anything of them; one or two of those circular pieces of a sort of thick slate, with a hole perforated through the centre, and believed to be the currency of the early ages; and a stone ball, about the size of an ordinary ball. It is therefore presumable that the Roman Catholic Chapel and Burying ground occupied the site of the more ancient faith."

The Scotsman for Wednesday, 26 September 1866 records the sale of the 176 acre estate and states that the dwelling house was built around the ancient chapel of St Mary, being repaired and improved.

In the 1980s a group of 'Wicca' chose the Chapel Hill top to hold a 'Halloween' festival with a large bonfire, etc., much to the surprise of the locals.

=== The Moot of Chapelton ===
A Moot Hill of Chapelton is recorded in the Register of the Great Seal of Scotland as being specifically excluded by King James from a grant of lands including Lainshaw, Robertland and Gallowberry to Alexander Hume in the 15th century. This could be a secondary use of a burial mound, although a number of the 'Moot' or 'Justice' Hills seem to have been constructed for the purpose. It may imply that the chapel itself was not on the hill, given that the 15th-century date is pre-reformation and the chapel would therefore be still in use.

=== Alternative names for the Chapel Hill ===
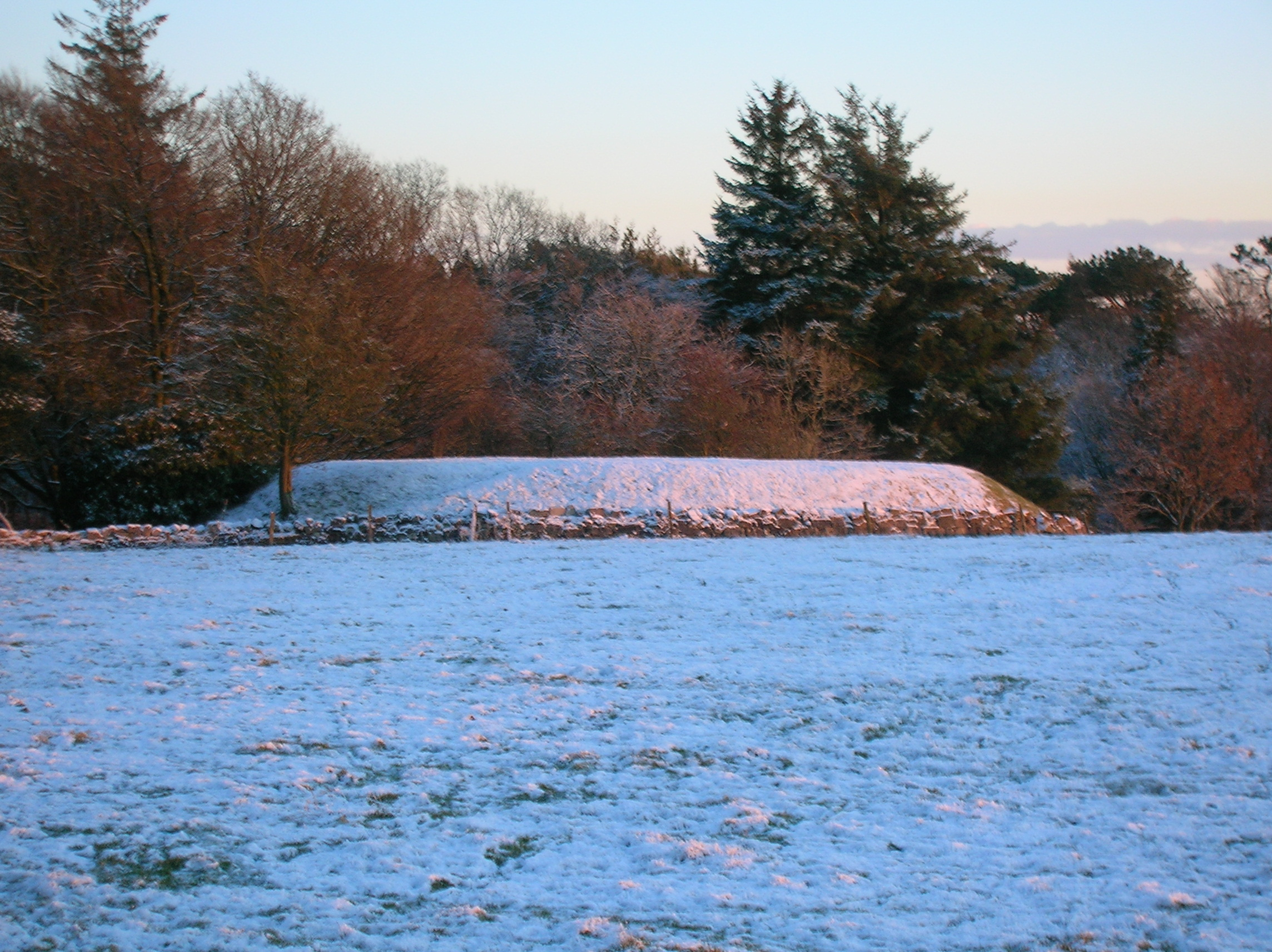
The Chapel Hill from near Chapeltoun Mains.

Alternative local names for the burial mound are the 'Jockey's cap' and the 'Monk's Graveyard', the 1897 OS map states that human bones were found in the hill. The Forrest family of Byres Farm are direct descendants of the Templetons and they use the term 'Monk's Graveyard' for the Chapel Hill. The validity of oral tradition in this case is exceptionally strong and may indicate that the chapel was not on the mound but on the site of the old Chapelton House. John Dobie in his additional notes to his father's work calls the site 'the Chapeltons'. The mound itself is one of the finest preserved Bronze Age burial mounds in Ayrshire. A previous owner of the Chapel Hill mound allowed an unofficial excavation to take place in around 2001. It is not known if any finds were made.

A visit by the OS in August 1982 stated that "It is difficult to make any accurate assessment of this feature. It has obviously been altered and landscaped beyond any recognition of its original form, and in its present state has an ornamental appearance. Situated on the edge of a natural N–S scarp line at approximately 60 m, it is possible that this was at one time just a slightly raised promontory, but as such, it is almost certainly not a motte and would be more typical of a homestead position in this region."

The name 'Jockey's Cap' originates from the days when the annual 'Stewarton Bonnet Guild Festival' included horse racing – like the 'Irvine Marymass' Celebrations still do. The mound was the perfect site for viewing the 'racecourse' set out on the field below 'Chapeltoun Mains'. The shape of the mound is reminiscent of a jockey's cap.

== Chapelton and the Kennox connection ==
Sir Neil Montgomery of Lainshaw married Elizabeth Cunninghame of Aiket and one of their sons, John of Cockilbie, had a son named John of Crivoch in the mid-17th century. He may have lived at Crivoch before it was purchased by the Somervilles and passed by marriage to the MacAlisters.

Signature of John Somervell of Kennox, 1728.

The letters of Sir David Cunningham of Auchenharvie to his cousin the laird of Robertland preserved in the National Archives of Scotland detail his efforts to purchase some of these lands (NAS GD237/25/1-4) He sold some of them in turn to James Douglas of Chesters in 1642 (RGS, ix, (1634–1651), no.1189) In around 1700 John Somerville of the Kennox Estate in Lanarkshire purchased the Bollingshaw (now Bonshaw) Barony, including Chapeltoun, and built Kennox (also Kenox in 1832 and Kennoch in 1792) House on the lands of Montgomerie – Crevoch.

Signature of James Miller who inherited Chapelton, then called Laigh Chapelton, in 1775.

Signature of John Miller who inherited Chapelton, then called Laigh Chapelton, from his father James in 1789.

Signature of Col. Charles Somerville McAlester Esq. who purchased Chapelton on 6 February 1827.

Signature of James Somerville McAlester Esq. of Kennox who inherited Laigh Chapelton from his father Charles on 25 April 1848.

Signature of John Cunningham, Ironmaster of Barrhead who purchased the Chapelton estate from James McAlester Esq. in May 1874.

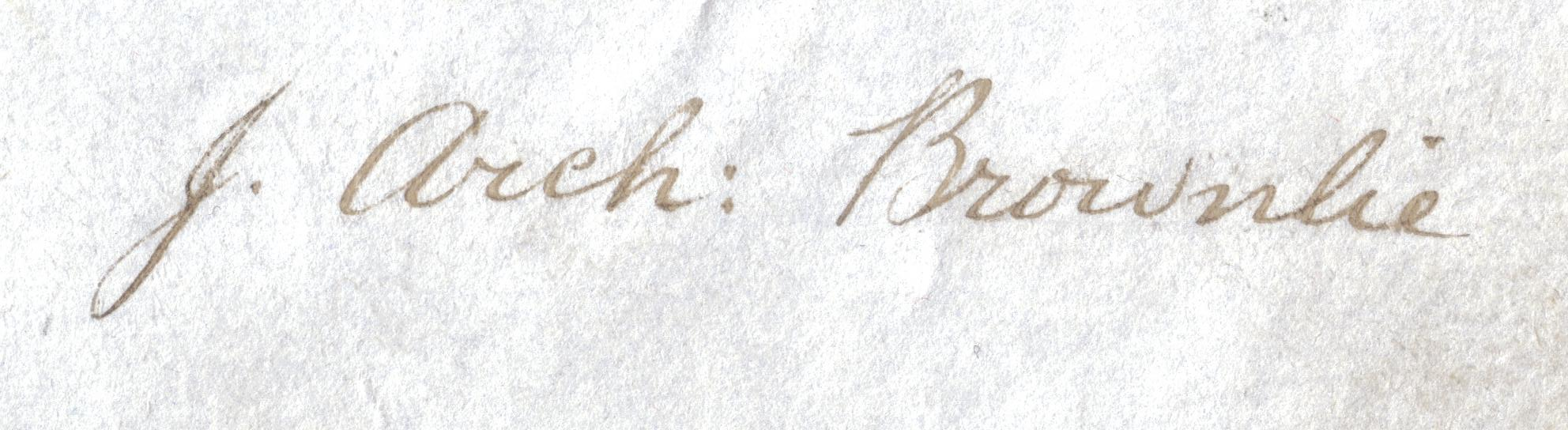
Signature of John Archibald Brownlie of Monkcastle purchased the Chapelton estate on 21 November 1888 from John Cunningham, Ironmaster, Barrhead.

Signature of John Faulds who lived at Mosshead in 1728.

1848 Signature on vellum of William Cuninghame Esq. of Lainshaw, superior of the Barony of Lainshaw.

Hugh Montfode of that Ilk's sister Jean was married to John Miller of Laigh Chapelton who died in 1622; they had a son Hugh Miller. Jean Montfode nominated John Miller to be her executor. The American genealogist Steve Miller has revealed that in 1828 the deceased John Miller, was through his son James who was then living at Montfode House, being sued by Col Charles S. McAlister of Kennox.

Charles S. McAlister and Janet had four children. They bequeathed the part of the Barony of Bollingshaw named Chapelton (the glebes and chapel lands of the Register of Sasines) to their younger son James, who never married and died in 1857.

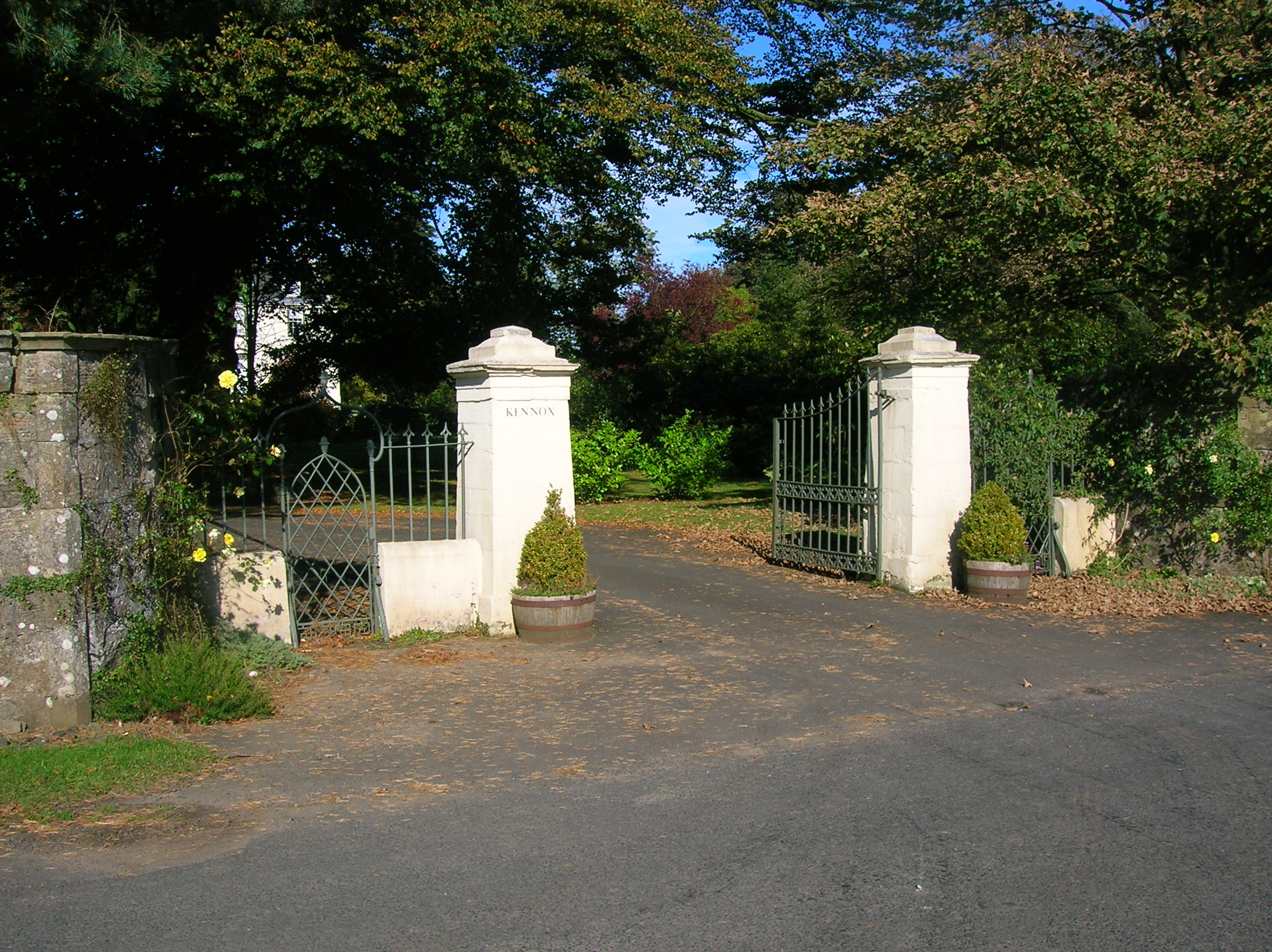
The gates and remains of the old lodges at Kennox House in 2007.

No date is given for when James Somerville obtained Chapelton, however we know from Dobie that James McAlister, nephew of the aforementioned James, was the owner in 1874. This James McAlister, the nephew of James Somerville, also never married. Chapelton had been re-acquired into the Bollingshaw Barony for him by his father, Charles McAlister.

== Templeton becomes Chapelton and develops into an Estate ==
The Armstrong map of 1775 show a 'Laigh' in fairly close proximity to the 'Chapel'. This is in all probability Laigh Chapelton, suggesting that a dwelling existed at this date and adding strength to the supposition that Laigh Chapelton was a building, or the site of a building, of some considerable antiquity. A legal document, 'Defences for James Wilson of High Chapelton sued by John Miller of Laigh Chapelton' in 1820 gives us the names of the tenants of both of these properties at this time The rental valuie circa 1820 was £180.

The formal name change from Templeton to Chapelton did not occur as a result of the rediscovery of the St. Mary's Chapel ruins by the new landowner, James McAlister, for it had clearly never been truly lost as such. However the discovery may help provide an approximate date for the reconstruction / extension of the house at Laigh Chapelton. Paterson says in 1866 that the chapel discovery was some years before, evidence from Dobie gives us the date of 1836 and Smith's evidence gives the date of 1845. Aitken shows only a Laigh Chapelton Farm in 1829 and all this suggests that the 'old' Chapelton House and estate were developed in around 1830 to 1850. The early to mid-19th century is a time during which many country houses were built, modernised or extended and OS maps show the increasing importance of the Laigh Chapelton estate around this time, with the development of formal gardens (from the 1858 OS), new driveways, etc.

=== Chapeltoun Mains ===
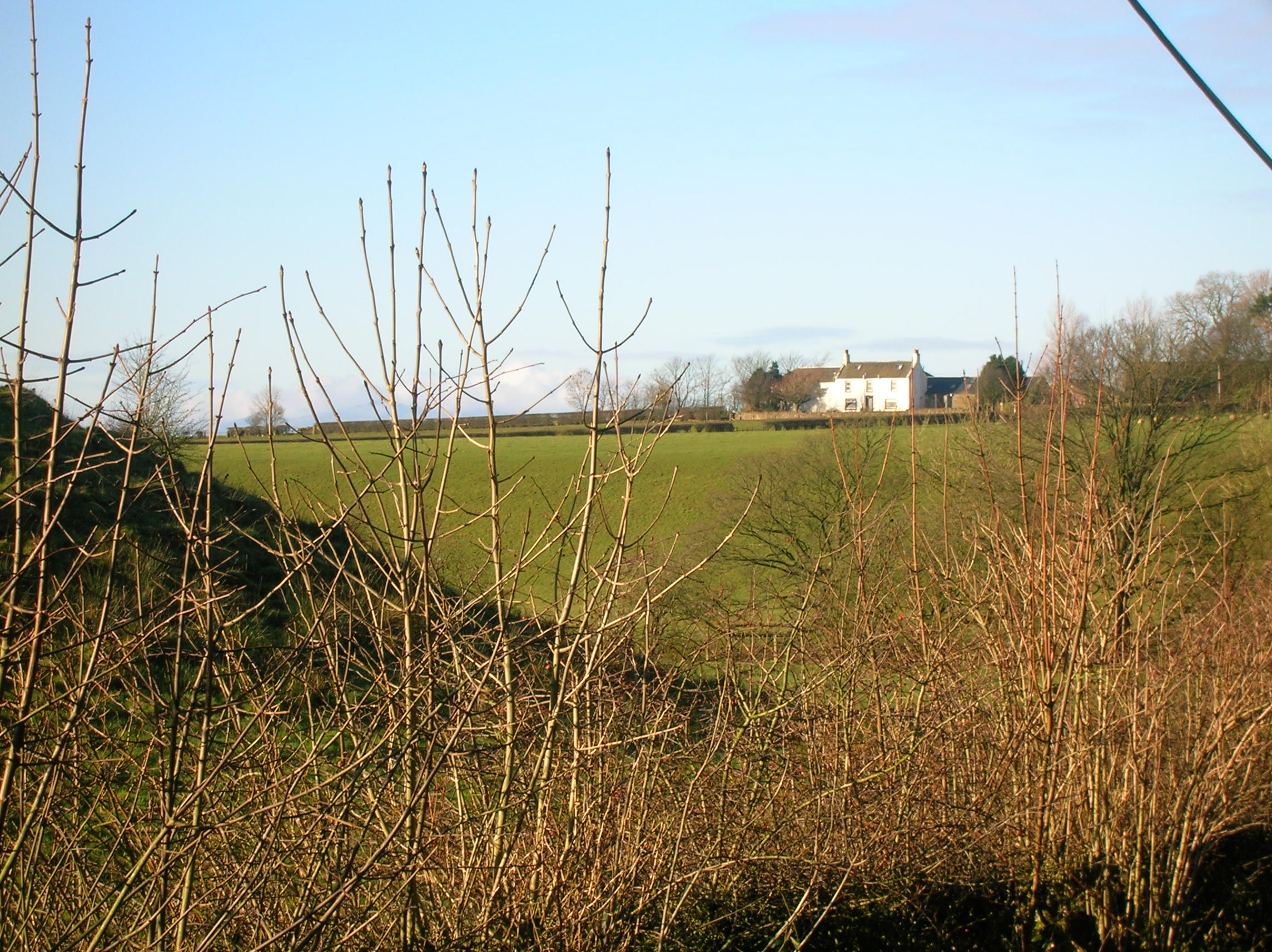
Chapeltoun Mains farm with 'Black Sawney's Park' in front, taken from near Chapeltoun Bridge.

Chapeltoun (Chapleton, Chappleton, Chapeltown, etc.) Mains farm changes its name from simple Chapelton, which Laigh Chapelton now adopts as the site of the new mansion house, sometime between 1829 and 1858. This suggests that at this time Chapelton Mains was the home farm prior to the building of what is now Chapelhill House in around 1911, as judged from the OS maps. A small building appears near the site of Chapelburn Cottage from 1858. The area around the front of the farm is referred to as 'Black Sawneys Park'; 'Sawney' being a Scots term for 'Alexander'. At one time it effectively meant a 'Scotsman', as with the use of the name 'Jock'. Another explanation is that the field had black sandy soil due to the river flooding onto the holm and creating rich fertile soil.

=== Wattshode ===
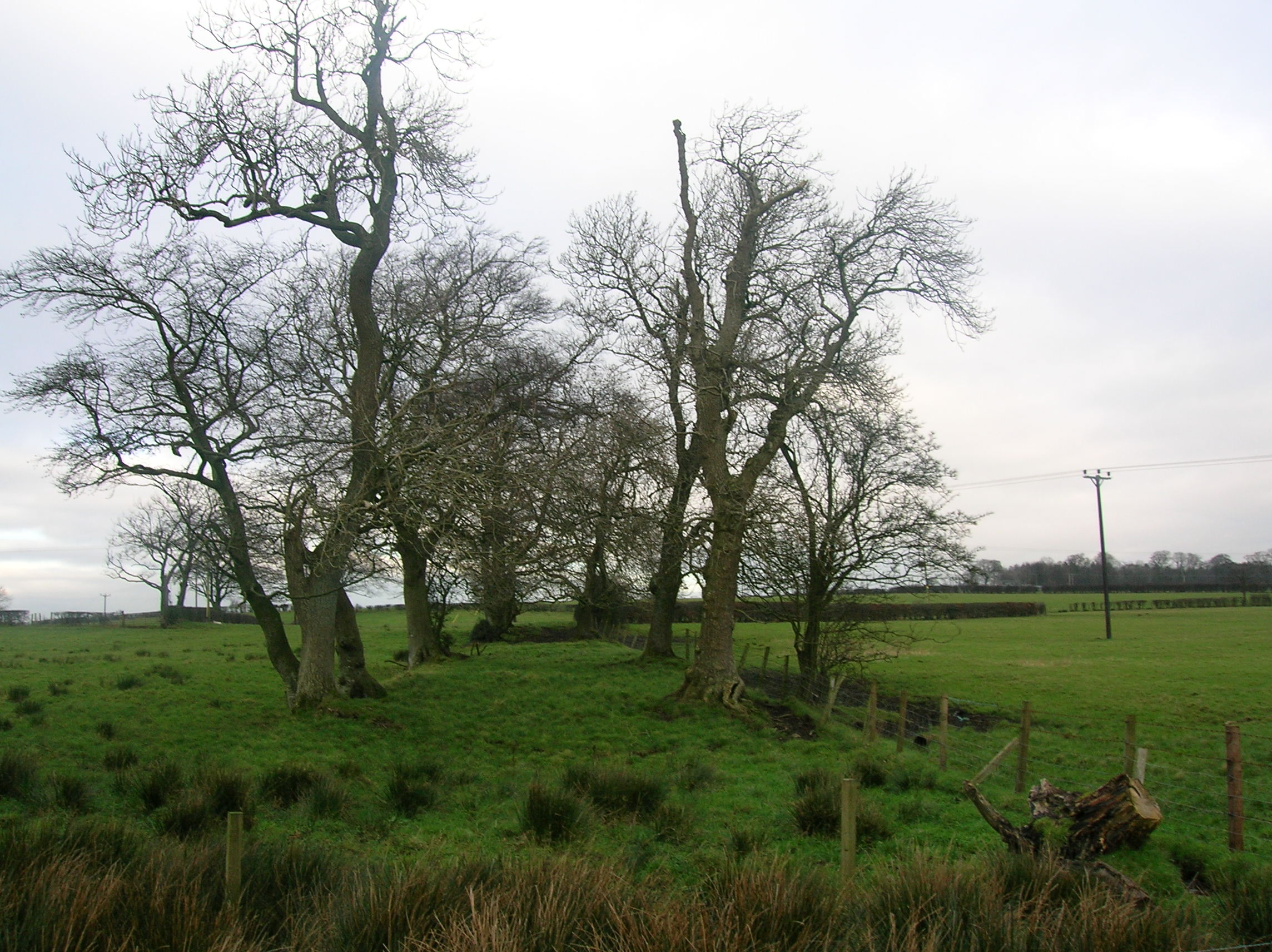
The shelter belt and site of Wattshode.

A small property set in 4 acres (1.6 ha) of the 5 Merk lands of Chapelton, named Wattshode or Wattshod is mentioned as far back as 1723 in the Chapeltoun Mains legal papers. Armstrong records a 'Wetshode' in 1775. In 1598 the word 'Wattshode' was some sort of fabric, frequently described as blue. It could include the local surname name 'Watt'. The Scotsman for Wednesday 26 September 1866 advertises the sale of Chapeltoun, Wattshode and Mosshead.

A shelter belt beside the track up to Bogflat and signs of nettle growth restricted to the possible site of a building suggests that Wattshode stood in this 4-acre (1.6 ha) field behind Cankerton (previously Cantkertonhole). General Roy's map of 1747 – 55 marks only Watshode and Chapeltoun by name. 'Red Wat-shod' is a Scots expression used by Robert Burns meaning blood-spattered boots.

=== Chapelton Moss Head, Bottoms point Crivoch, and Bogside ===
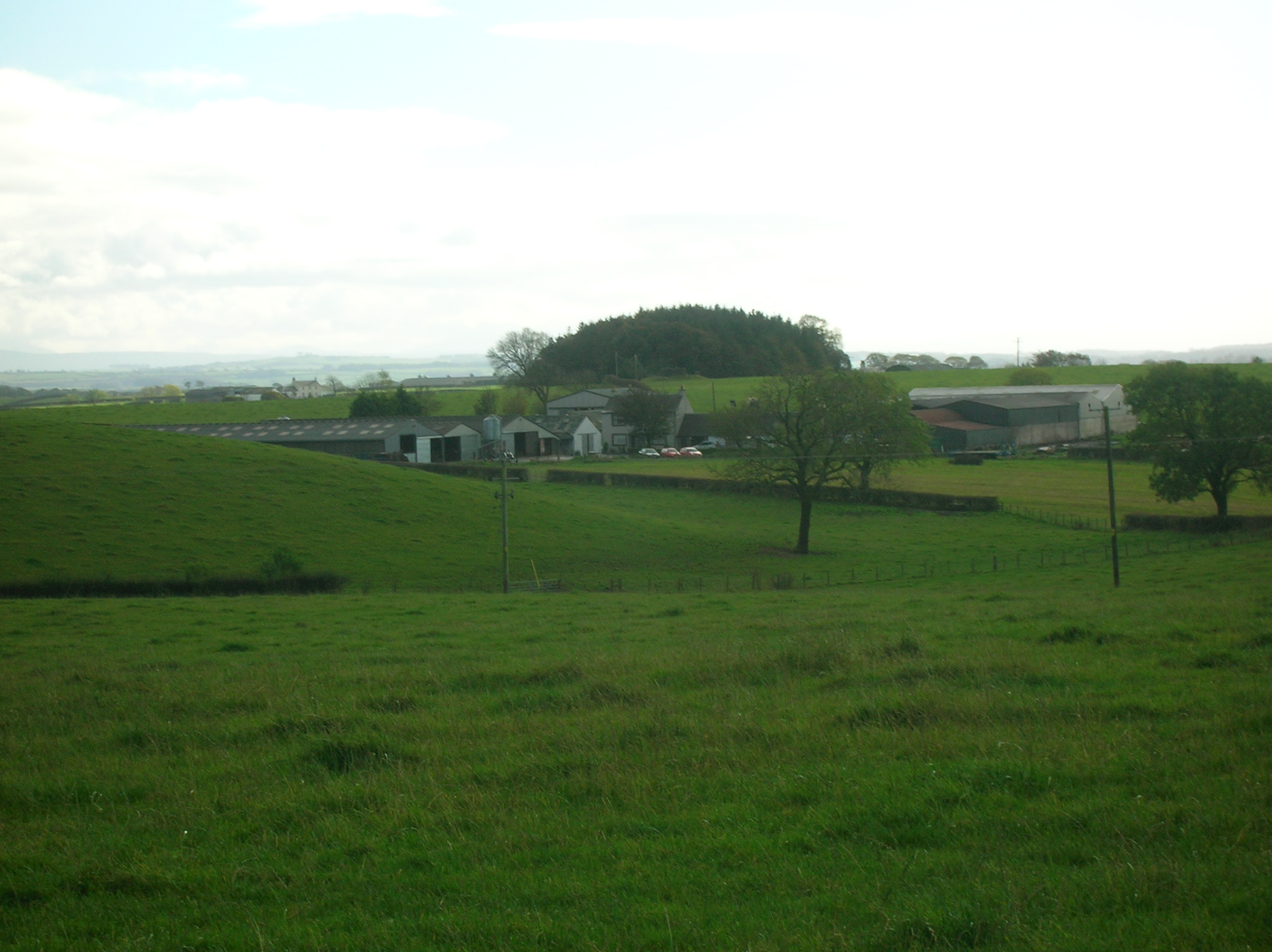
Bottoms point Crevoch Farm.

A farm originally called Chapelton Moss Head by Thomson in 1828 or Mosshead of Chapelton, is later called just Mosshead and was situated in the fields of Bottoms Farm with its entrance just after the bridge over the Chapel Burn. All traces of it above ground have vanished, while Bogside cottage is still represented by building debris at the edge of the field near the entrance to the Bogflat Farm. Bogside had a rental value of £10 in 1820 and the proprietor was Robert Stevenson. Bottoms point Crevoch farm still exists close to Kennox (2009). The Scotsman newspaper in 1866 records the sale of the lands of Chapeltoun, Wattshode and Mosshead.

=== Bogflat ===
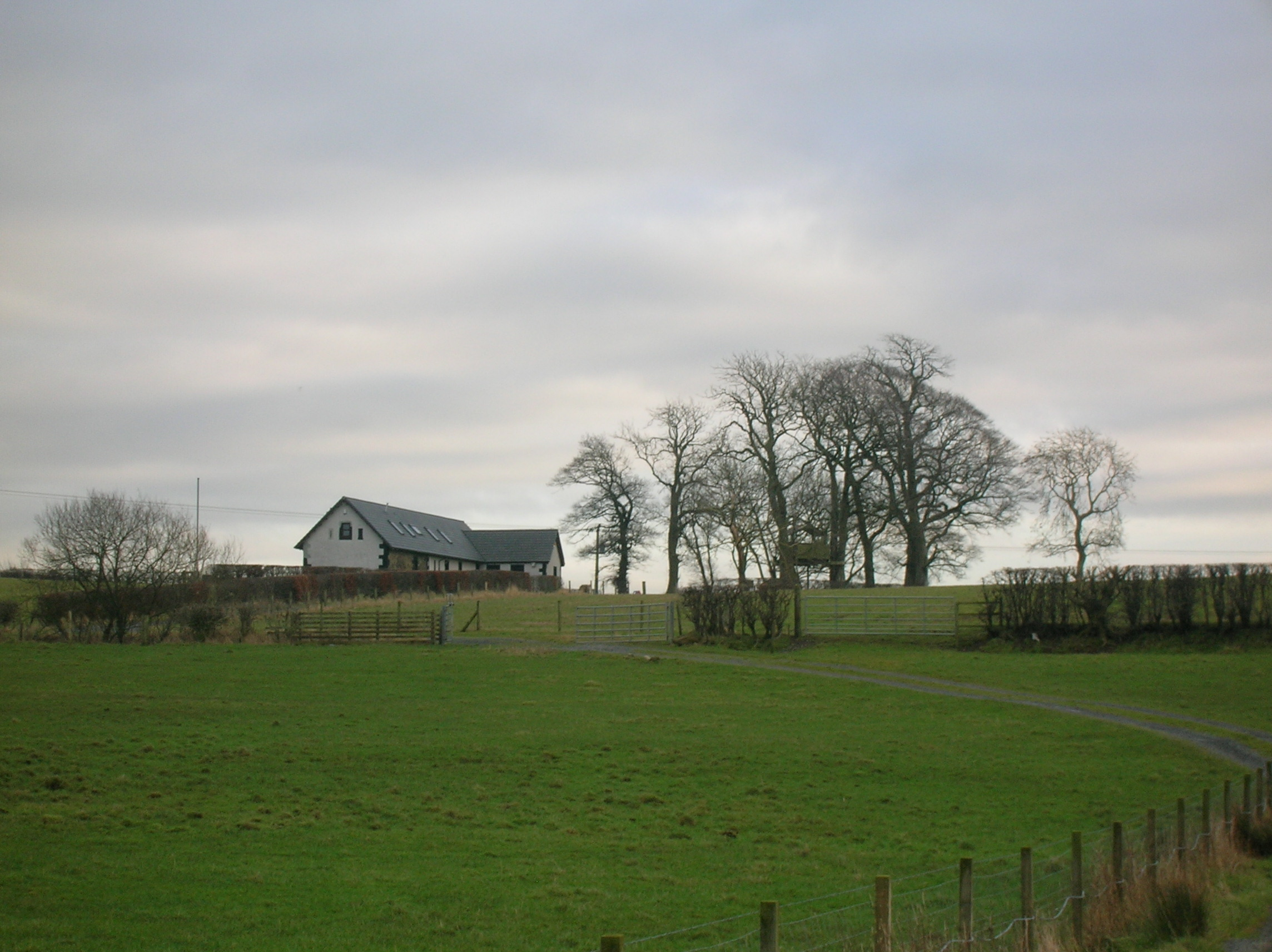
Bogflat Farm.

Bogflat Farm has been lovingly rebuilt circa 2004 by Stuart Kerr and his wife Stephanie. Stewarton Old Parish Records show Hugh Parker and his spouse Susanna Wardrop living at Bogflat in 1809 when their daughter Annabella was born. The Parkers were still in residence at the time of the 1841 census. Neighbours Susanna Wardrop Parker of Bogflat Farm and Agnes Wardrop Watt in Parkside Farm were sisters. John Earl and Isobel his spouse were residing at Bogside in 1827.

In 1881 an Alexander Muir, aged 38, a general merchant lived at Bogflat with his wife Margaret and sons David and John. A building named Bog is marked on Armstrong's 1775 map and this was most likely Bogflat for we know from a Marriage stone from Bogflat, now in the Stewarton Museum, that a dwelling was there in 1711 with a 'JR' recorded and other initials, unfortunately now cut off.

In 1919 Robert Bryce, Import and Export Merchant of Melbourne, Australia owned Chapelton and Bogflat.

In May 1941 a bomb was dropped on the nearby Anderson's Mount and a pipe was laid from the resultamt crater to the well at Bogflat as the crater had filled with water and was kept full by the springs here (see video).

=== Parkside (Windwaird) and Cankerton Hollow ===
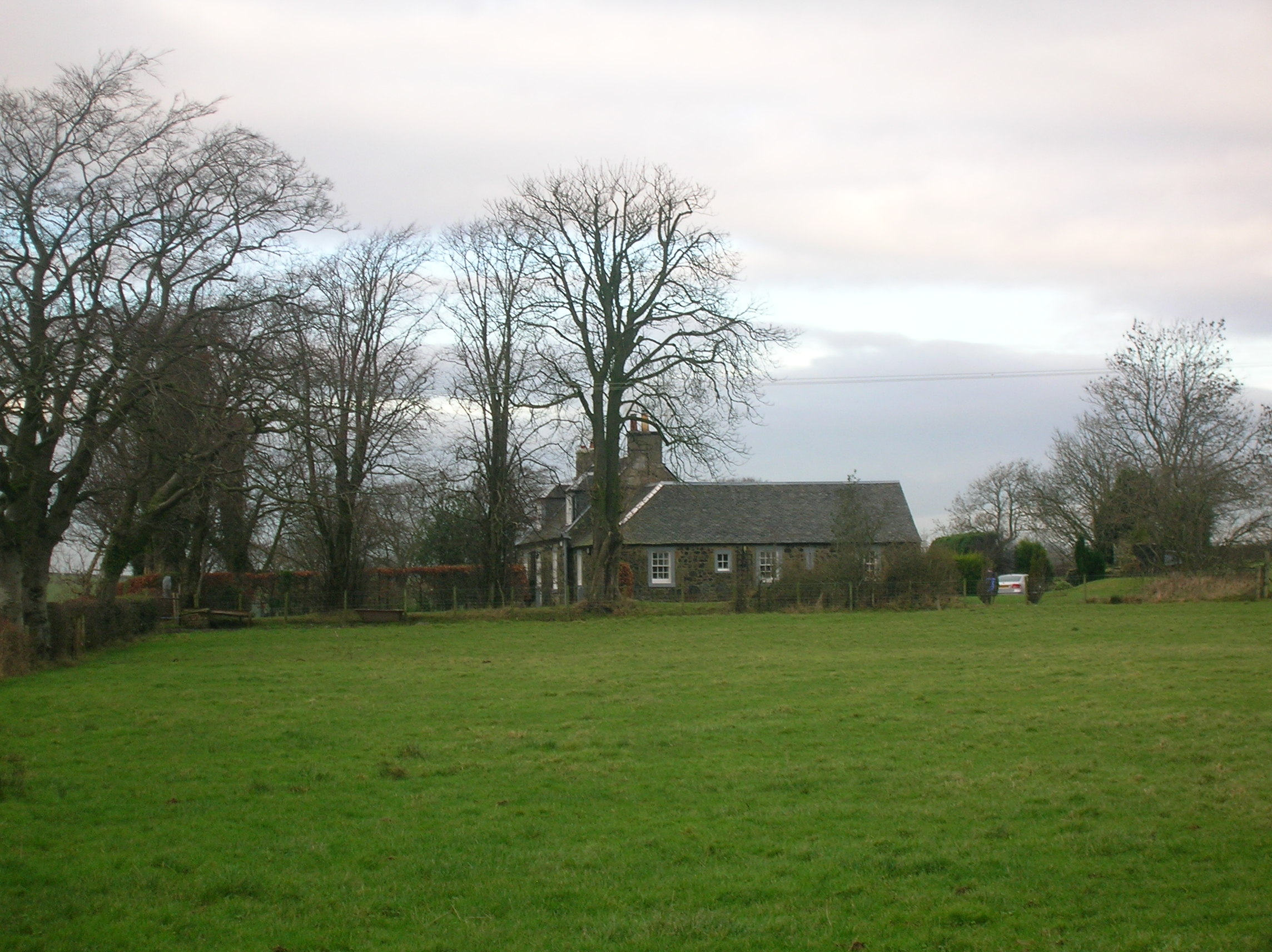
Cankerton, previously Cakertonhole, from near Wattshode.

Windwaird is the name given by Aitken in 1829 to a house on the Torranyard to Stewarton road, not far from the fairly recently created entrance for pedestrians to Lainshaw House that runs through the Anderson Plantation (a name marked on the maps but not used by the local farmers). This building is called Parkside on the OS maps, first shown on the 1832 map, it is marked on the 1960, but not the 1974 OS. Stewarton Old Parish Records show Alexander Watt and his wife Agnes (Wardrop) in Parkside when their daughter Mary was born in May 1809. In 1809, neighbours Susanna Wardrop Parker in Bogflat Farm and Agnes Wardrop Watt in Parkside Farm were sisters. The last family to live here were the Muir's, relatives of the Muir's of Gillmill (also Gillmiln) Farm. A 'park' refers to an area of enclosed land in the days when most land was not enclosed with hedges or fencing.

In 1616 the "lands of the Waird, etc." were conveyed to David Cunninghame of Robertland by William, Lord Kilmaurs (McNaught 1912), but any connection with this site is unproven. A waird is a feudal land tenure right conferred through military service obligations of tenants (see Definitions and Scot's words). Wardpark near Lochridge is spelt Wairdpark in Pont's map of 1604.

Cankerton or Cankerton Hollow is rarely indicated by name; it was the home of James Orr, farmer who died on 6 April 1859 aged 43 (born 31 May 1845). His wife Mary King Brown had died on 12 July 1845 aged just 25 (born 20 September 1820). Another John Orr farmed here with his spouse Janet Wilson. He died on 21 January 1847, aged 68, and she died on 16 October 1889, aged 79, having moved into High Chapeltoun to live with her brothers. Husband & spouse were buried at the Laigh Kirk, Stewarton. Cankerton, originally Cankerton was also found locally as a surname, but the etymology is unclear, a 'canker' usually meaning a 'blight, a fungal disease' of trees or cereals. A Cankerton Estate is listed under a survey of coal deposits.

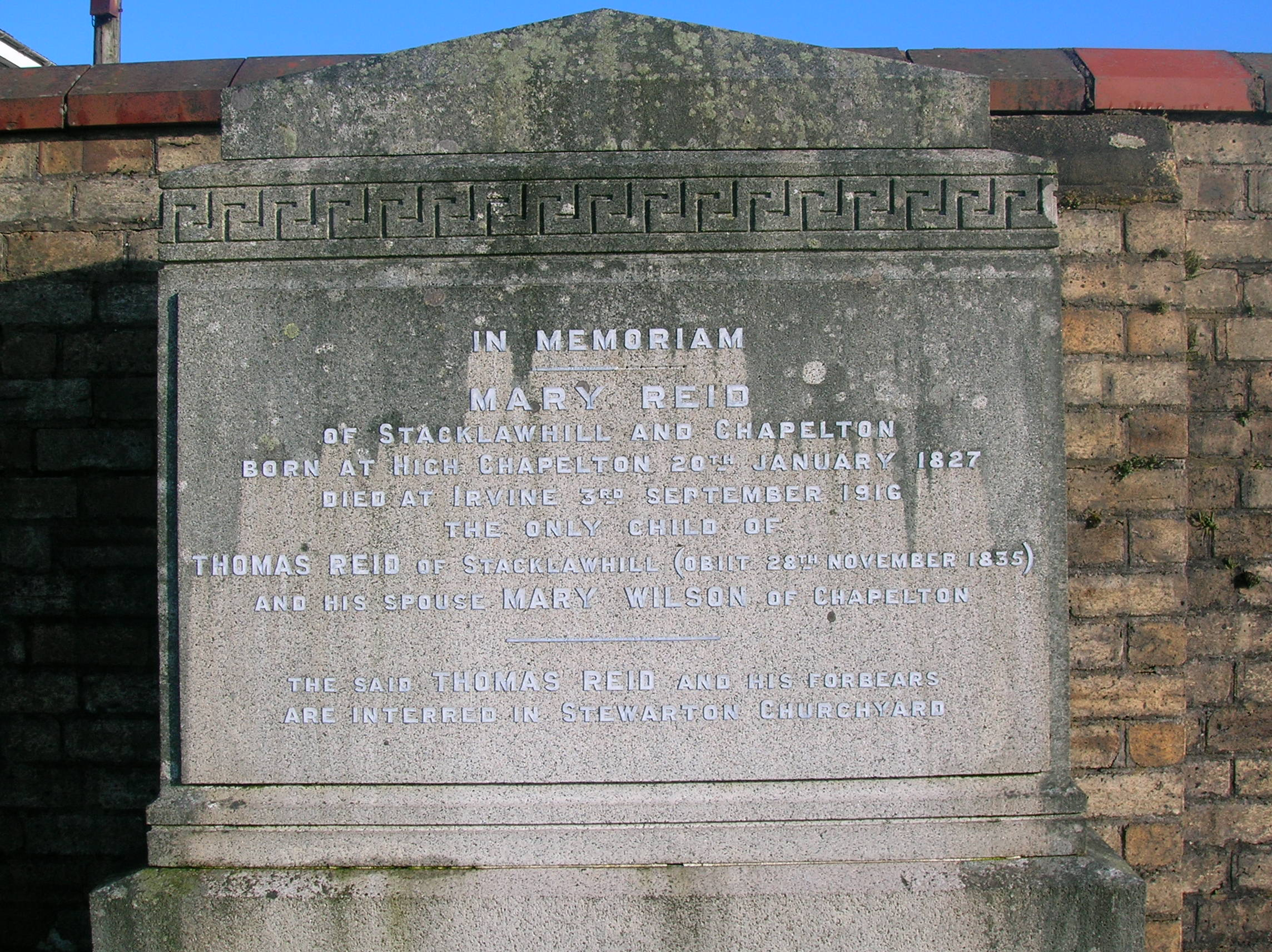
The gravestone of Mary Reid of Chapelton & Stacklawhill.

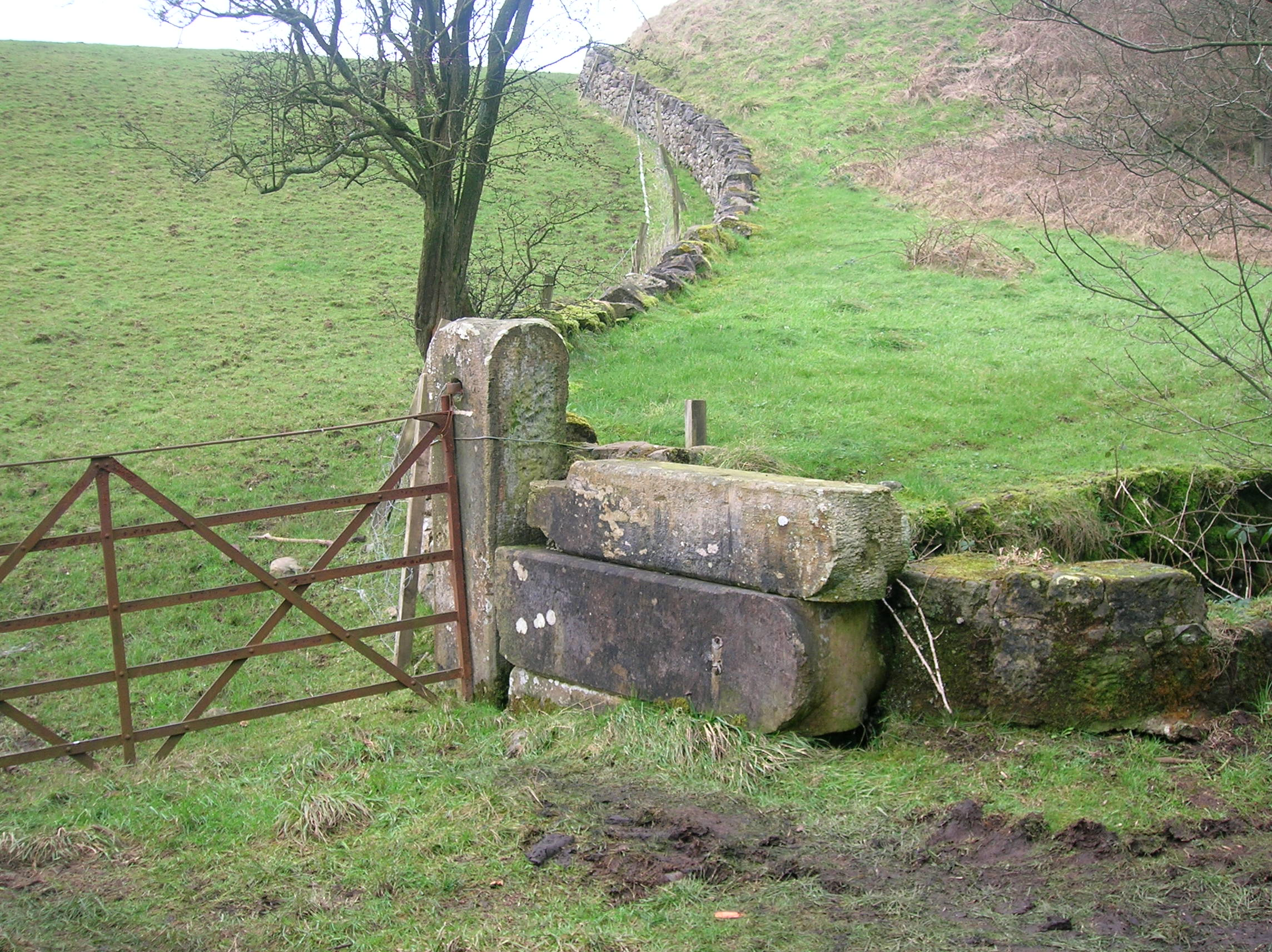
The old gateposts from the demolished Chapelton House lying near the Chapel Hill. The drystone dykes in the background were built with stones from the old house.

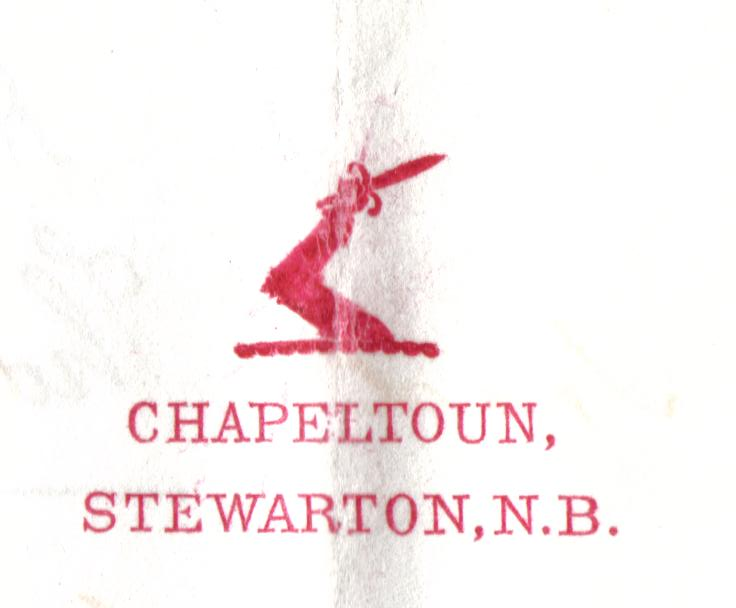
Archibald Brownlie's headed notepaper of 1895.

Signature of Hugh Neilson who purchased Chapelton in 1899 from J Archibald Brownlie of Monkcastle, Banker.

=== High Chapeltoun ===
High Chapelton is first marked on the 1829 and the 1858 maps, together with a limekiln and a ford over the Annick. An old track is seen running from the farm to the field containing the 'grain barn' near Laigh Castleton; ploughing in this field has not turned up any stones, building or otherwise therefore suggesting a building constructed from wood. James Wilson and his spouse Mary Steven farmed at High Chapeltoun in 1760, when she died, aged 56. They were buried at the Laigh Kirk in Stewarton. Mary Reid of High Chapelton and Stacklawhill was born here on 20 January 1827, daughter of Thomas Reid of Stacklawhill. His wife was Mary Wilson of High Chapelton. The memorial stone is in the Stewarton cemetery. The rental value in around 1820 was £137.

== Chapelton (old) house and gardens ==
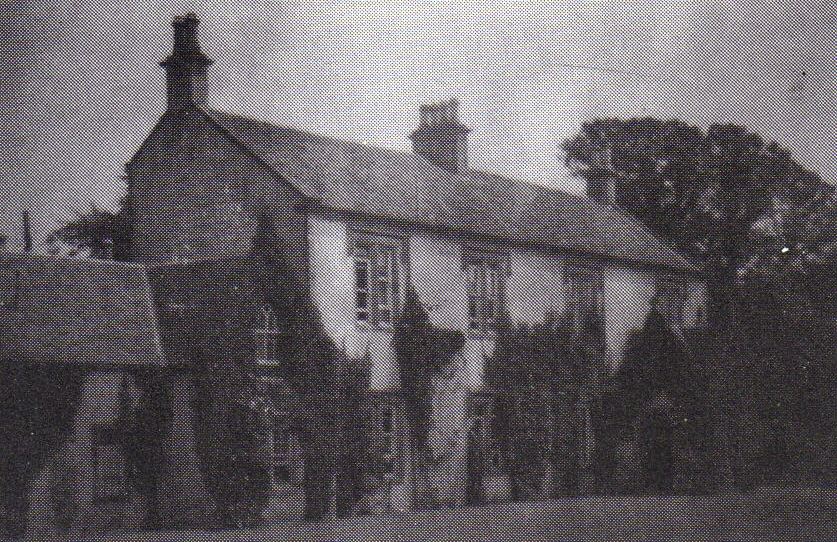
The old Chapeltoun House prior to 1908.

The 1858 OS shows two buildings on the site, very close to each other but not physically connected. One building probably being the old Laigh Chapelton Farm and the other, on the right, being the residence built for James McAlister. The photograph (Davis 1991) seems to be of the side of the house facing onto the road and the Chapel Hill. The 1851 OS shows formal gardens with a boundary wall, paths and a central feature, possibly a pond. The 1897 OS shows one large building with wings and extensions which appear to be porches and possibly a conservatory. By this date the formal gardens are absent, as in the 1911 OS. The ha-ha is not shown in the large scale map of 1897 OS, but appears to be present in the 1858 and the 1911 editions. No footbridge can be made out, however the OS maps have a number of errors and omissions, especially the exact outlines of buildings which are often only 'approximations'. Between 1858 and 1897 a main driveway has been constructed into the grounds from nearly opposite the Chapel Hill and a formal path with steps leads from the position of today's main entrance down to Chapelton House.

== Construction of the New Chapeltoun House and Estate ==
The Chapelton (old) House was demolished in around 1908, possibly following a fire as this is the strong local tradition for the demise of the house. A Miss Mary McAllister may have been the last occupant of the house. Some of the dressed stonework may have been used in the building of the new house, garden and drive walls, the sides of the Chapel burn and elsewhere. The walling around the field side of the Chapel Hill mound is not entirely built with stones from Chapelton (old) House as some old building rubble was brought in from elsewhere at a much later date by the owner of Chapeltoun Mains, Mr. A. Robinson.

The gate to the field below the mound has three sandstone gateposts laid horizontally, two of them are exceptionally large and could be the ornamented gateposts from the old entrance and driveway to Chapelton (old) House. The actual drive is now represented by the curling pond behind the walled up entrance and the OS maps show an entrance here until at least 1911. Chapeltoun Mains has only one gatepost and both High Chapeltoun and Chapelhill house have none. These changes probably reflect the requirement to have access for large modern farm machinery. The gateposts are machine cut sandstone and the same design is found elsewhere, such as at the Kennox lodge, Cankerton and opposite Peacockbank Farm (previously Pearce Bank) near Stewarton, near the original entrance road to Lochridge. In 1775 Armstrong's map shows the road going no further than Lochridge (formerly Lochrig). A wind-pump is shown situated above Chapeltoun House on the 1923 OS map.

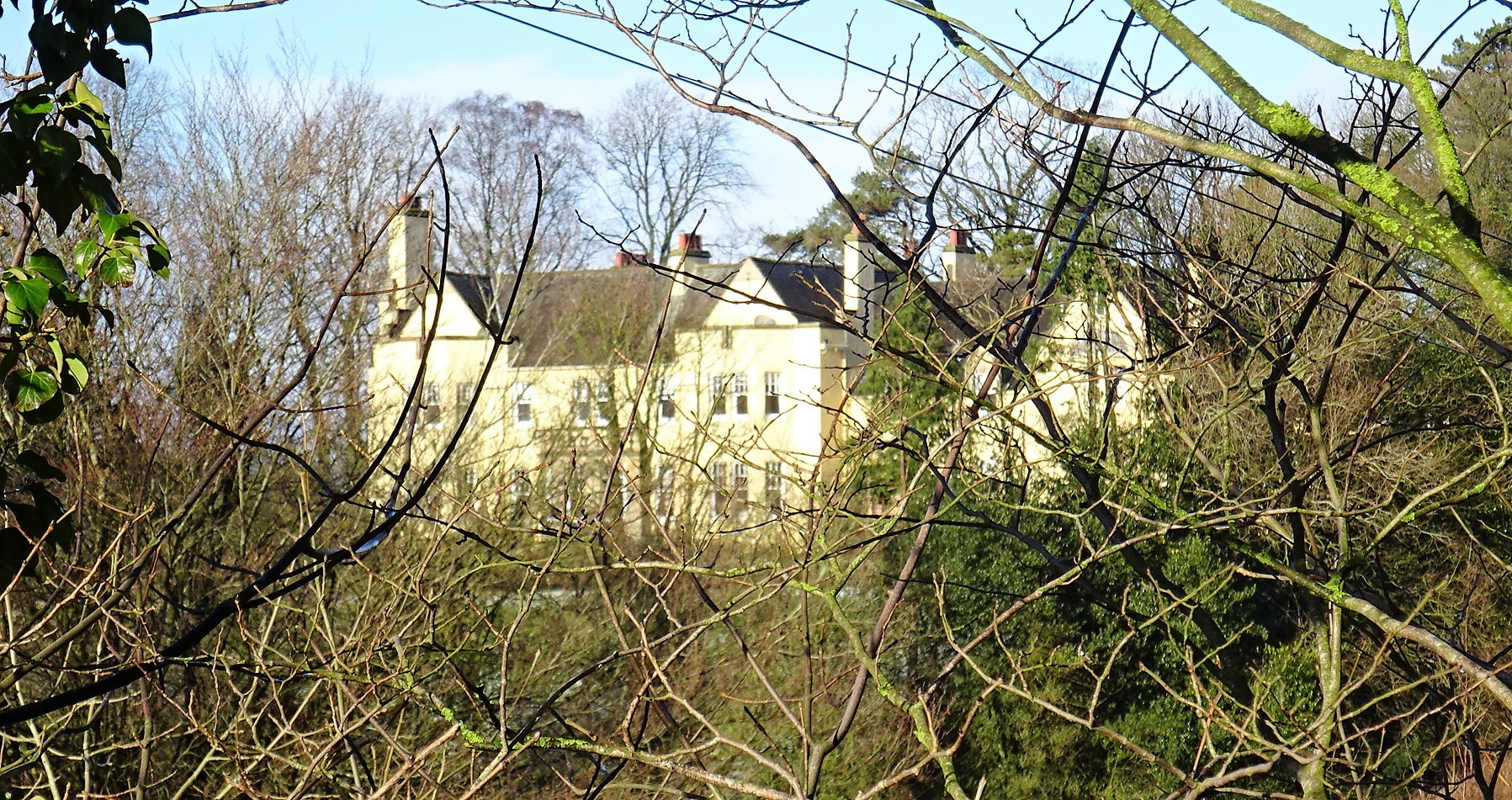
Chapeltoun House

During demolition it was noted that the stonework in the lower story of Chapelton (old) House was noticeably older than the upper story as would be expected if Laigh Chapelton had developed into Chapelton when it acquired an owner with greater financial means, Mr. James McAlister (or MacAlester), who added first a new 'mansion house', later an upper story to the old farm, developed the ornamental gardens and probably built the bridge over the river with the associated 'ha-ha' (see the section on the estate gardens and landscape).

Michael Davis records that Hugh Neilson, the owner of 'Summerlee Iron Company' had the present mansion house designed in 1908 by Alexander Cullen, an architect from Hamilton. Harling is used extensively on the walls and this was originally left in an unpainted, artistic, grey state. The family moved into the house in 1910, however The gate-lodge was not built until around 1918, having been designed by Cullen, Lochhead and Brown. R.W.Schultz had proposed a terraced garden in 1911, but it is not known to what extent the existing terraces reflect this design. The pillars at the base of the main flight of steps incorporate old ornamental worked sandstone, presumably from the Chapelton (old) House. A separate conservatory building existed in front of the house at one time according to the Kilmarnock Glenfiled Ramblers. The name 'Chapeltoun', with the extra letter 'u' was presumably adopted for the new mansion house.

A small iron cannon dated 1840 once stood in front of the house having been built by Mr Neilson at his Oak Bank Foundry.

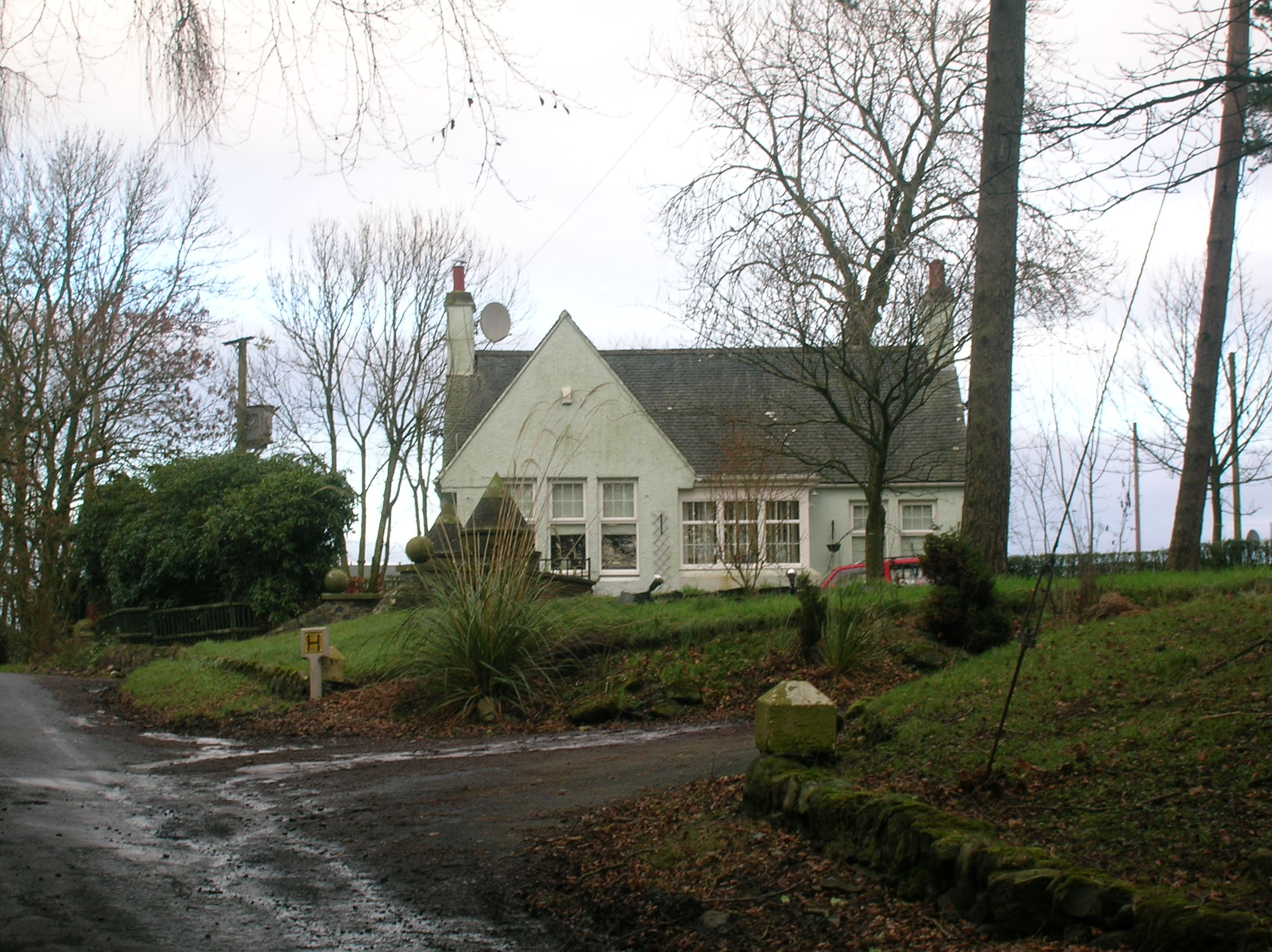
The lodgehouse at Chapeltoun House.

Hugh Neilson was a keen player of the bagpipes and the music could be heard at many of the surrounding farms, drifting up from the estate gardens. He was also very fond of curling and as soon as the weather was cold enough he would invite all the locals down for a match and a dram at his curling pond (Hastings 1995). It is believed to have been restored when the house was a hotel, using concrete and tarmac.

The Chapeltoun Estate was never very large, incorporating Chapeltoun Mains, High Chapeltoun, the home farm (now Chapelhill House), Chapelburn Cottage, Mosshead of Chapelton Farm, Bogside cottage and Bogflat. Cankerton (Cankertonhole) and Bloomridge (Bloomrig) were part of the Kennox Estate. Between 1924 and 1960 the Neilsons owned Linn House in Dalry.

Bogside cottage was lived in by Mr. Troop and his family and later on by a Mr. McGaw who worked at Chapeltoun Mains. He was the Chapeltoun House gardener. Mr. Thow (pronounced Thor) a forester, lived with his family at the Bogflat Farmhouse. A chauffeur, a Mr. McLean lived at Chapelburn cottage and Firbank existed as a small copse with a possible (unrecorded) standing stone, the bungalow was built in the 1970s.

An incident remembered by Mrs. Wilson is that of Mr. Neilson challenging a young man from Kilmaurs to a fist fight because he had found that the man was courting one of his housemaids.

The 'mansion' house of 1910 has had a number of changes of use after it was a private house, being the headquarters of an insurance company and a hotel under several different owners, before becoming a family home again around 2004. The Lobnitz family of Chapeltoun House moved to High Clunch. The Third Statistical Account of 1953 still records Chapeltoun as being one of the six main estates in the parish of Stewarton.

== Gardens and landscape ==
A finial from Chapelton House or possibly a 'wheat sheaf' from the old Monks' Well is used as a feature in the gardens. Apart from pure ornamentation the finial can also function as a lightning rod, and was once believed to act as a deterrent to witches on broomsticks attempting to land on one's roof. On making her final landing approach to a roof, the witch, spotting the obstructing finial, was forced to sheer off and land elsewhere. An old lintel from a door is recorded in 1939 as being built into a wall in the garden with the inscription 'S.M. 1740', possibly standing for one of the 'Miller' family'.

=== The Monks' well ===
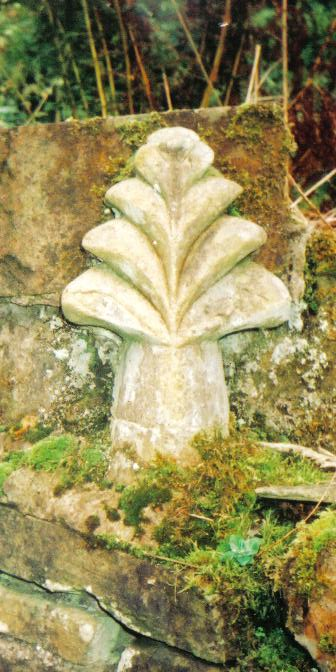
A possible finial from the entrance porch at old Chapelton House or a 'wheat sheaf' from the Monks' Well.

In the woodland policies of Chapeltoun House is the Monks' Well (OS 1974), fountain or spring as indicated on the OS maps going back as far as 1858. Its present appearance is probably as a Victorian or Edwardian 'whimsy' or 'folly' with a large, thick sandstone 'tombstone appearance' with a slightly damaged cross carved in relief upon it and a spout through which the spring water once passed into a cast iron 'bowl'. The Kilmarnock Glenfield Rambler's visited Chapeltoun in 1939 and recorded that a gargoyle had once been present as a spout and that the 'cross' was actually a 'wheat sheaf' that had stood on top of the stone.

It seems unlikely from the workmanship that the well's stone and 'cross' have anything to do with the old chapel, but one possibility is that it came from over the entrance door to Laigh Chapelton as the custom was for a Templar property to have the 'cross' symbol of the order displayed in such a fashion. On the other hand it could have been made for the Chapelton (old) House to associate the building with the Christian history of the site. The stone is unusually thick and has been clearly reworked to pass a spout through it.

The OS record that in the 1970s a Mr. H.Gollan of Chapeltown stated that the 'Monk's Well', was believed to have been associated with the chapel. In July 1956 the OS state that the 'Monk's Well' is a spring emerging through a stone pipe, situated in a stone-faced cutting in the hill slope. Above the spring is a stone slab with a cross in relief.

=== The Curling pond ===
A well is marked near the Chapelton (old) House which became a pump later and may now be represented by a surviving stone lined well with steps leading down to it. The water from this well was used to fill the Curling Pond which was built by the Neilsen's on the site of the original driveway into the old house/farm. It is said that the curling pond was constructed on the site of the old stables.

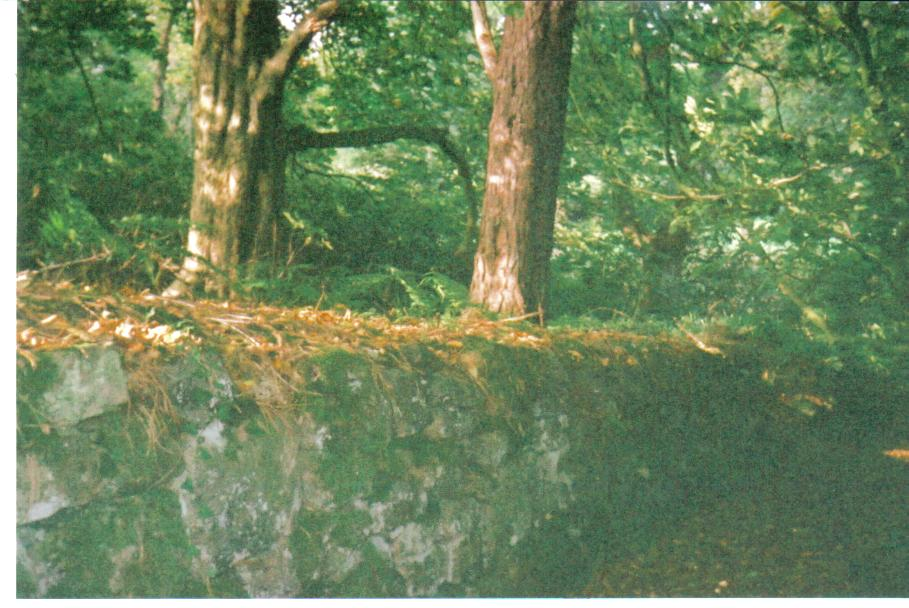
A view of the Chapelton ha-ha.

At the top edge of riverside meadow are to be found a couple of sizeable glacial erratics, which were dug out during the construction of the sewerage treatment plant. The remains of the abutments of a footbridge across the river are visible where the garden boundary hedge meets the Annick and Florence Miller remembers the bridge as still standing in the late 1920s. This presumably Victorian or Edwardian feature would take people across to the area delineated by a small ha-ha, now thick with rhododendrons (R.ponticum), typically planted by estate owners.

=== The ha-ha ===
On the Lambroughton side of the river is a substantial wall with a wide ditch in front, built with considerable labour and of no drainage function. This structure was probably a ha-ha (sometimes spelt har har) or sunken fence which is a type of boundary to a garden, pleasure-ground, or park so designed as not to interrupt the view and to not be seen until closely approached. The ha-ha consists of a trench, the inner side of which is perpendicular and faced with stone, with the outer slope face sloped and turfed – making it in effect a sunken fence. The ha-ha is a feature in many landscape gardens laid and was an essential component of the "swept" views of Lancelot Capability Brown. "The contiguous ground of the park without the sunk fence was to be harmonized with the land within; and the garden in its turn was to be set free from its prim regularity, that it might assort with the wilder country without". Most typically they are found in the grounds of grand country houses and estates and acted as a means of keeping the cattle and sheep out of the formal gardens, without the need for obtrusive fencing. They vary in depth from about 5 feet (Chapeltoun House) to 9 feet (Petworth).

The old driveway to Lainshaw House off the Stewarton to Torranyard road also has a ha-ha on the side facing the home farm before it reaches the woods. The name ha-ha may be derived from the response of ordinary folk on encountering them and that they were, "...then deemed so astonishing, that the common people called them Ha! Ha's! to express their surprise at finding a sudden and unperceived check to their walk." An alternative theory is that it describes the laughter of those who see a walker fall down the unexpected hole. A seat may have been situated by the ha-ha and the woodland view would have been, and indeed still is, very attractive as this area is clearly an ancient woodland remnant. The stone boundary wall stops in line with the ha-ha.

=== Chapeltoun Bridge ===
The Chapeltoun Bridge over the Annick and is a carefully designed sandstone structure complementing the scene. 'Stepping stones' are marked on the 1897 OS map as being located just downstream from here. The name Annick, previously Annock, Annoch (1791) or Annack Water, possibly derives from the Gaelic abhuin, meaning water and oc or aig meaning little or small. The valley which this river runs through was once called Strathannock. Immense labour has been expended building walls on either side of the river and even the Chapel Burn bed is 'cobbled'.

'Fossilised' linear bands of stone deposition in gardens which were part of this 'boundary' field suggest that the old Rig and furrow system was used hereabouts, however extensive modern ploughing has hidden the 'tell tale' signs. The amount of stone clearance in the 'Lambroughton Woods' bearing plough scoring, illustrates the extent of the ploughing. Other fields in the area still show these unmistakable signs of cultivation and place names such as Lochrig (now Lochridge) and Righead Smithy preserve the history of the practice.

== Natural history ==
The area of 'wild-wood' beyond the ha-ha, with its 'sheets of bluebells', the wood rushes, wood sorrel, dog's mercury, snowdrops, celandine, broad buckler, lady and male-shield ferns, helleborine orchids and other species typical of long established woodlands, abruptly ends at the 'march' (estate boundary) indicated by a large earth bund and a coppiced boundary beech. The 1858 OS shows the wood as confined to the area of the ha-ha, however by 1897 the OS shows woodland as far up as the march. The Lambroughton woods beyond (until recently the property of the Montgomery / Southannan Estate) are not shown on the older maps including the 1911 OS, they are shown in the 1960 OS map as a pine plantations amongst what was scrub or partial woodland cover containing elder, gean, ash, etc. Before this time the area above the river was not even fenced off at the top where it becomes 'level' with the field.

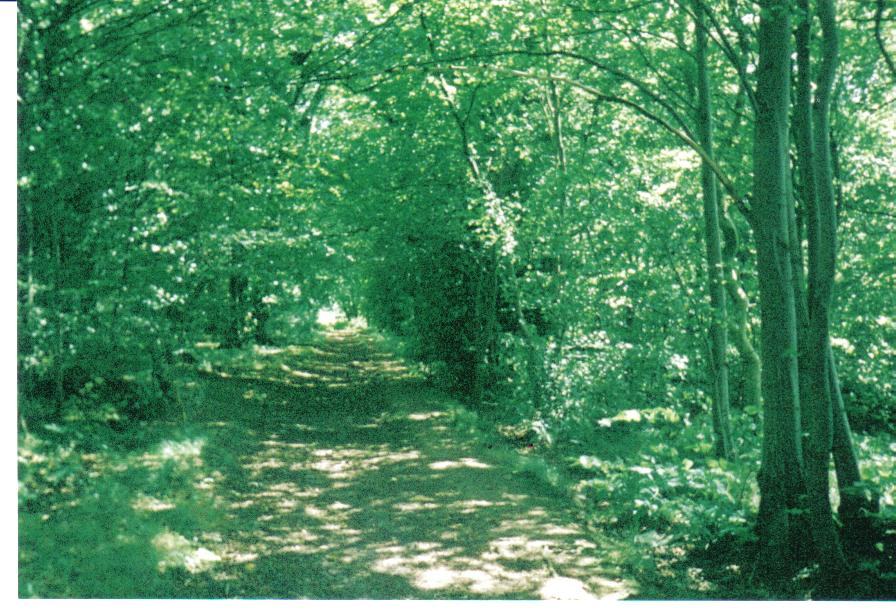
The Coach Road through the policies near the Lainshaw ha-ha prior to the creation of the SWAT paths.

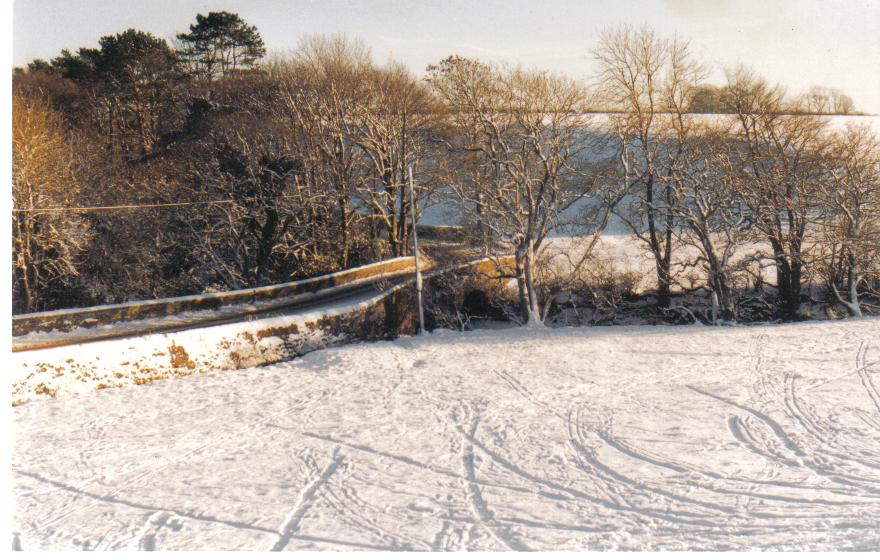
Chapeltoun Bridge and the River Annick from Chapel Hill.

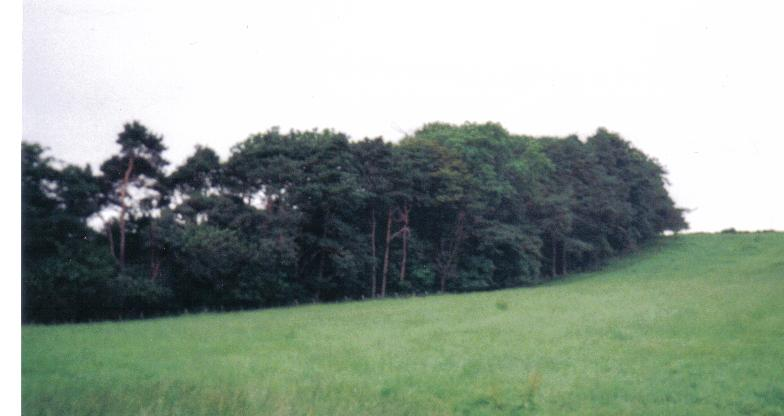
The woods above the River Annick as viewed from East Lambroughton.

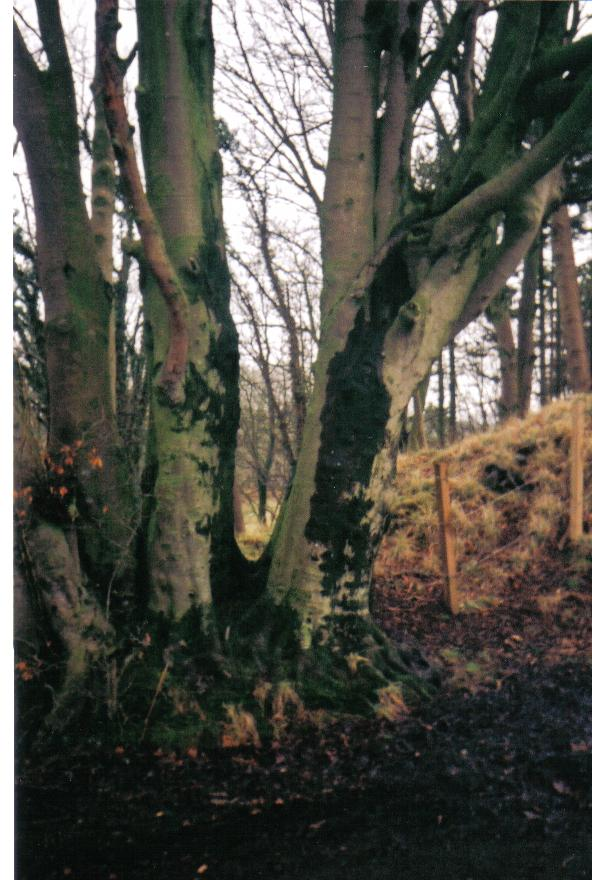
The Coppiced Boundary March beech Tree.

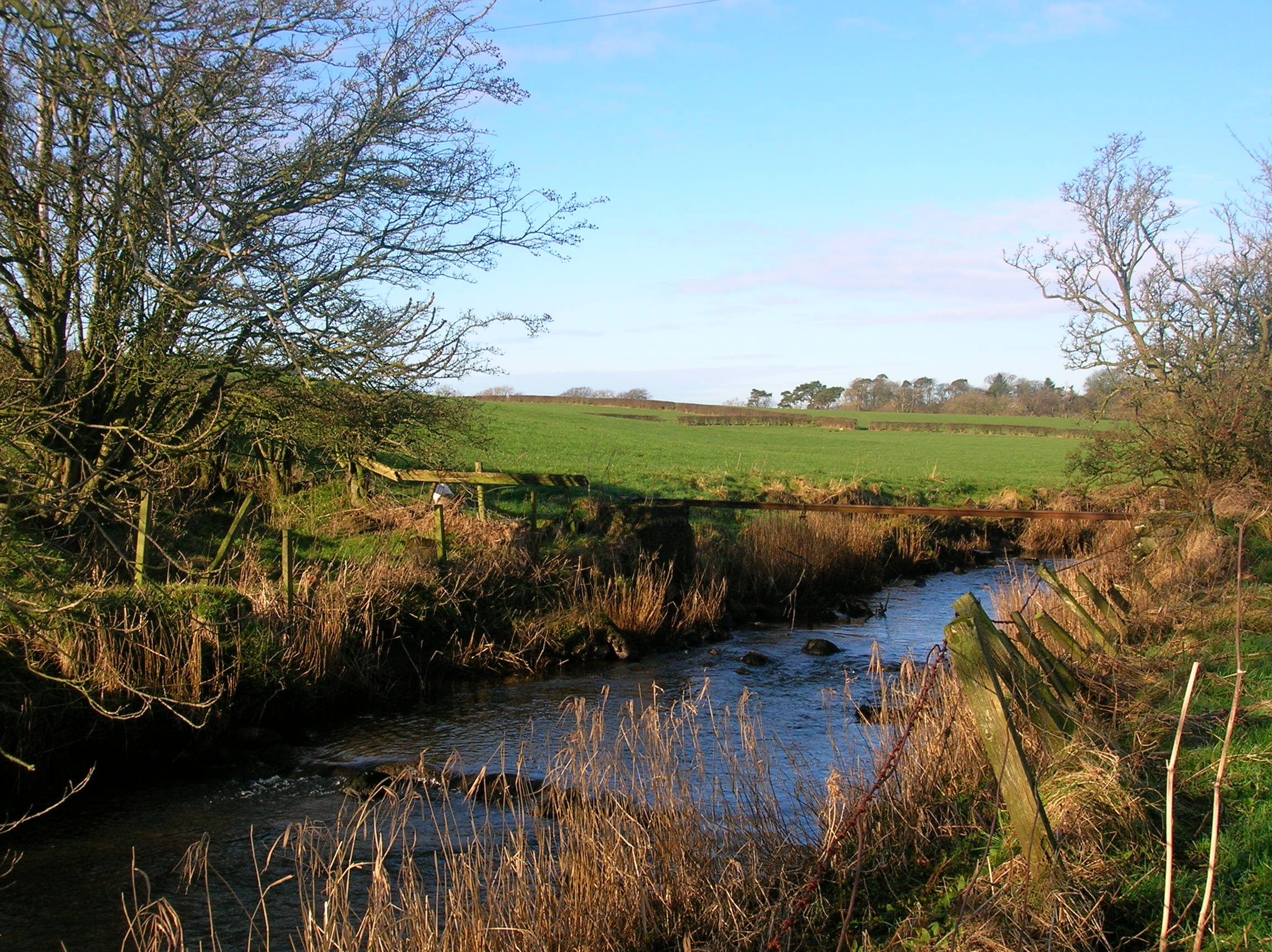
A view of the old Glazert ford at Haysmuir, with the Bonshaw woodlands in the background. One rail is left of an old footbridge.

Although giant hogweed is taking hold along the Annick (2006), however the riparian (water side) flora is still indicative of long established and undisturbed habitats. The rare crosswort, (a relative of the goosegrass or cleavers) is found nearby. The river contains, amongst others, brown trout, sea trout, salmon, eels, minnows, and stickleback. The water quality is much improved since the Stewarton cloth mills closed and the river no longer carries their dyes and other pollutants as shown by the presence of freshwater limpets and shrimps, together with leeches, caddis fly larvae and water snail species.

Kingfishers have been seen just downstream and the estate's woodland policies and river contain, amongst others, tawny and barn owls, herons, mallard, ravens, rooks, treecreepers, buzzards, peewits or lapwings, roe deer, mink, moles, shrews, grey squirrels, hares, hedgehogs, foxes, badgers, pipistrelle bats and probably otters. Migrating Canada and greylag geese frequent the nearby fields on their way up from the Caerlaverock or coming down from Spitzbergen in the winter. Duncan McNaught in 1895 records that he found a kingfisher's nest at an arms length inside an earthen burrow at Chapelton on the Annick.

The estate woodlands contains typical species, such as copper beech, horse-chestnut, yew, bay-laurel, oaks, ornamental pines, and a fine walnut. Several very large beeches and sycamores are also present. The Glenfield Ramblers recorded two especially rare species in the area of the Lainshaw Estate, the lesser wintergreen and the bird's nest orchid. Unfortunately no precise details of the site were recorded.

The hedgerow trees accepted today as part of the familiar landscape were not planted by farmers for visual effect, they were crops and the wood was used for building and fencing and the millers needed beech or hornbeam wood for mill machinery, in particular for the sacrificial cogs on the main drive gears. It is not generally appreciated how much the Ayrshire landscape has changed its character, for even in 1760–70 the Statistical Account it is stated that "there was no such thing to be seen as trees or hedges in the parish; all was naked and open".

The Glazert burn, previously Glazart or Glassert has otters and the rare freshwater mussel (source of freshwater pearls). The name may come from the celtic, glas in Gaelic meaning grey or green and dur meaning water. It is recorded by Dobie in 1876 as being a favourite resort of fishermen and this is still very much the case today (2006). Another River Glazert, runs through a considerable part of the parish of Campsie, emptying itself into the Kelvin, opposite the town of Kirkintilloch.

A number of small woodlands are marked as 'fox coverts', such as below Chapeltoun Mains and near Anderson's Plantation, left for foxes to breed and shelter in safety. The local Eglinton hunt used to meet at Chapeltoun House.

== The Toll Road and Milestones ==
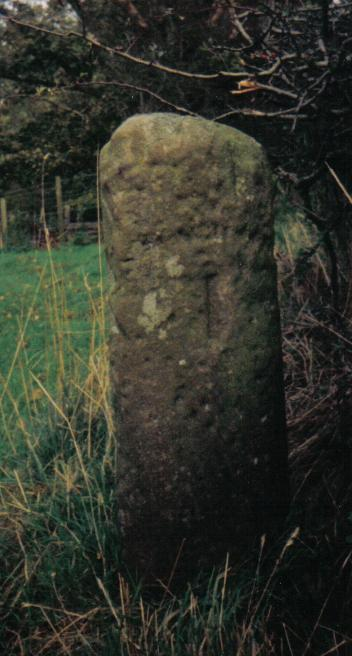
A Milestone near Stewarton in East Ayrshire.

Wheeled vehicles were unknown to farmers in the area until the end of the 17th century and prior to this sledges were used to haul loads as wheeled vehicles were useless. Roads were mere tracks and such bridges as there were could only take pedestrians, men on horseback or pack-animals. The first wheeled vehicles to be used in Ayrshire were carts offered gratis to labourers working on Riccarton Bridge in 1726. In 1763 it was still said that no roads existed between Glasgow and Kilmarnock or Kilmarnock and Ayr and the whole traffic was by twelve pack horses, the first of which had a bell around its neck. A mill-wand was the rounded piece of wood acting as an axle with which several people would role a millstone form the quarry to the mill and to permit this the width of some early roads was set at a 'mill-wand breadth'.

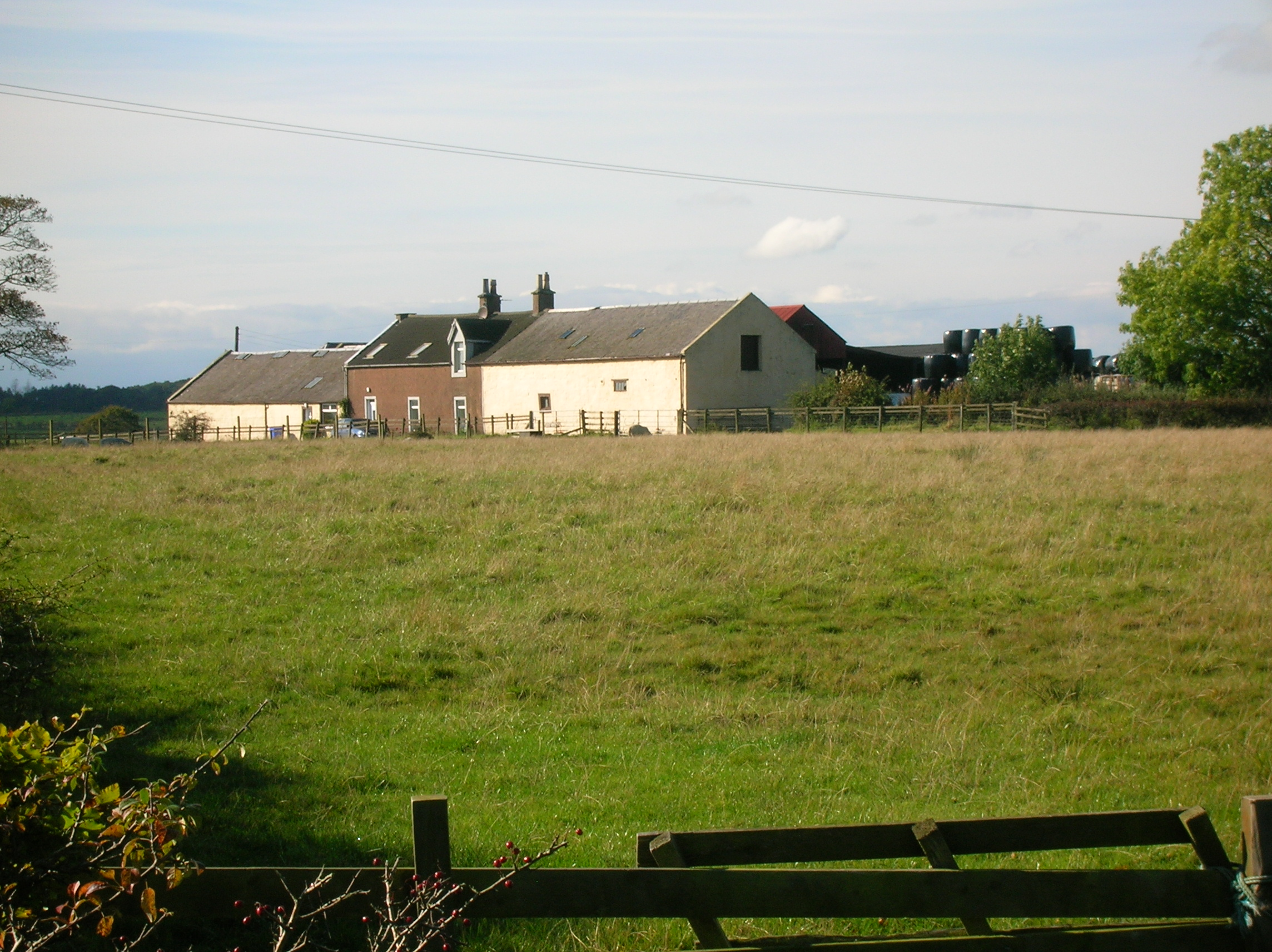
Crossgates Farm.

The Stewarton to Torranyard (Torrenzairds in 1613) road was a turnpike as witnessed by the farm name Crossgates (Stewarton 3 and Irvine 5 1/4 miles), Gateside (near Stacklawhill Farm) and the check bars that are shown on the 1858 OS at Crossgates and at the Bickethall (previously Bihetland) road end to prevent vehicles, horse riders, etc. turning off the turnpike and avoiding the toll charges. A small toll house is shown at Crossgates, now demolished, on the left when facing Torranyard. In Scots a 'bicket' is a 'pocket', an appropriate description of the area the farm lies in. A modern cottage nearby is called 'Robelle' after the farmers Robert and Isabelle from Bickethall.

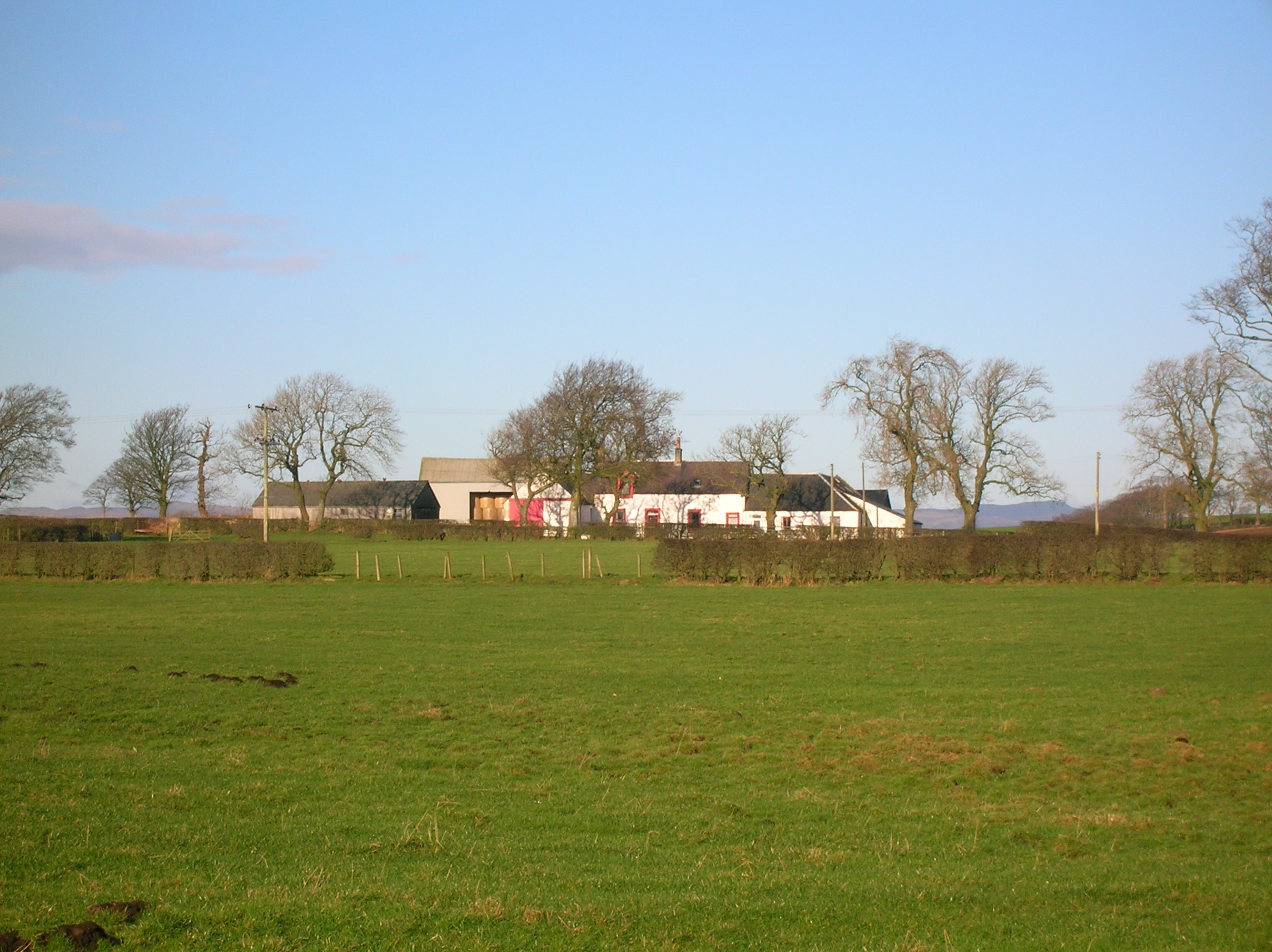
Bloomridge farm from Bogside.

The name 'Turnpike' originated from the original 'gate' used being just a simple wooden bar attached at one end to a hinge on the supporting post. The hinge allowed it to 'open' or 'turn' This bar looked like the 'pike' used as a weapon in the army at that time and therefore we get 'turnpike'. The term was also used by the military for barriers set up on roads specifically to prevent the passage of horses. Other than providing better roads, the turnpikes settled the confusion of the different lengths given to miles, which had varied from 4,854 to nearly 7,000 feet (2,100 m). Long miles, short miles, Scotch or Scot's miles (5,928 ft), Irish miles (6,720 ft), etc. all existed. Another point is that when the toll roads were constructed the Turnpike trusts went to considerable trouble to improve the route of the new roads and these changes could be quite considerable. The tolls on roads were abolished in 1878 to be replaced by a road assessment, which was taken over by the County Council in 1889.

Colonel McAlester was a member of the Turnpike Trust and no doubt exerted considerable influence over the route of the turnpike and other matters. John Loudon McAdam was very actively involved with Scottish Turnpikes, living at Sauchrie near Ayr until he moved to Bristol to become Surveyor to the local Turnpike Trust in 1826.

None of the toll road milestones are visible because they were buried during the Second World War to prevent them from being used by invading troops, agents, etc. This seems to have happened all over Scotland, however Fife was more fortunate than Ayrshire, for the stones were taken into storage and put back in place after the war had finished. The milestone near Bloomridge Farm and Kirkmuir Farm are likewise missing, presumed buried.

== Kirkmuir, Kirkhill, Gillmill, Righead and the Freezeland Plantation ==
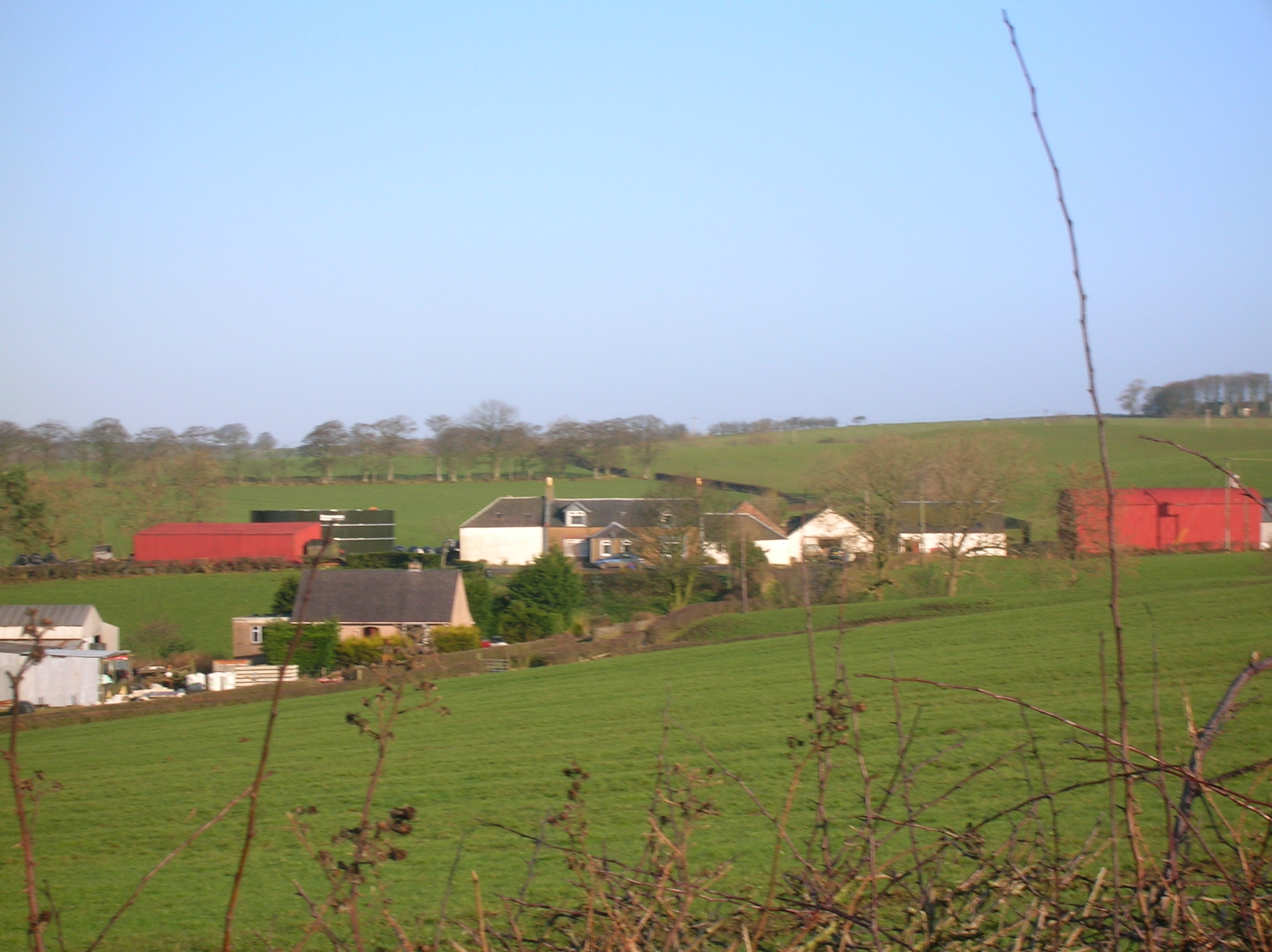
A view of Gill Mill farm in 2007.

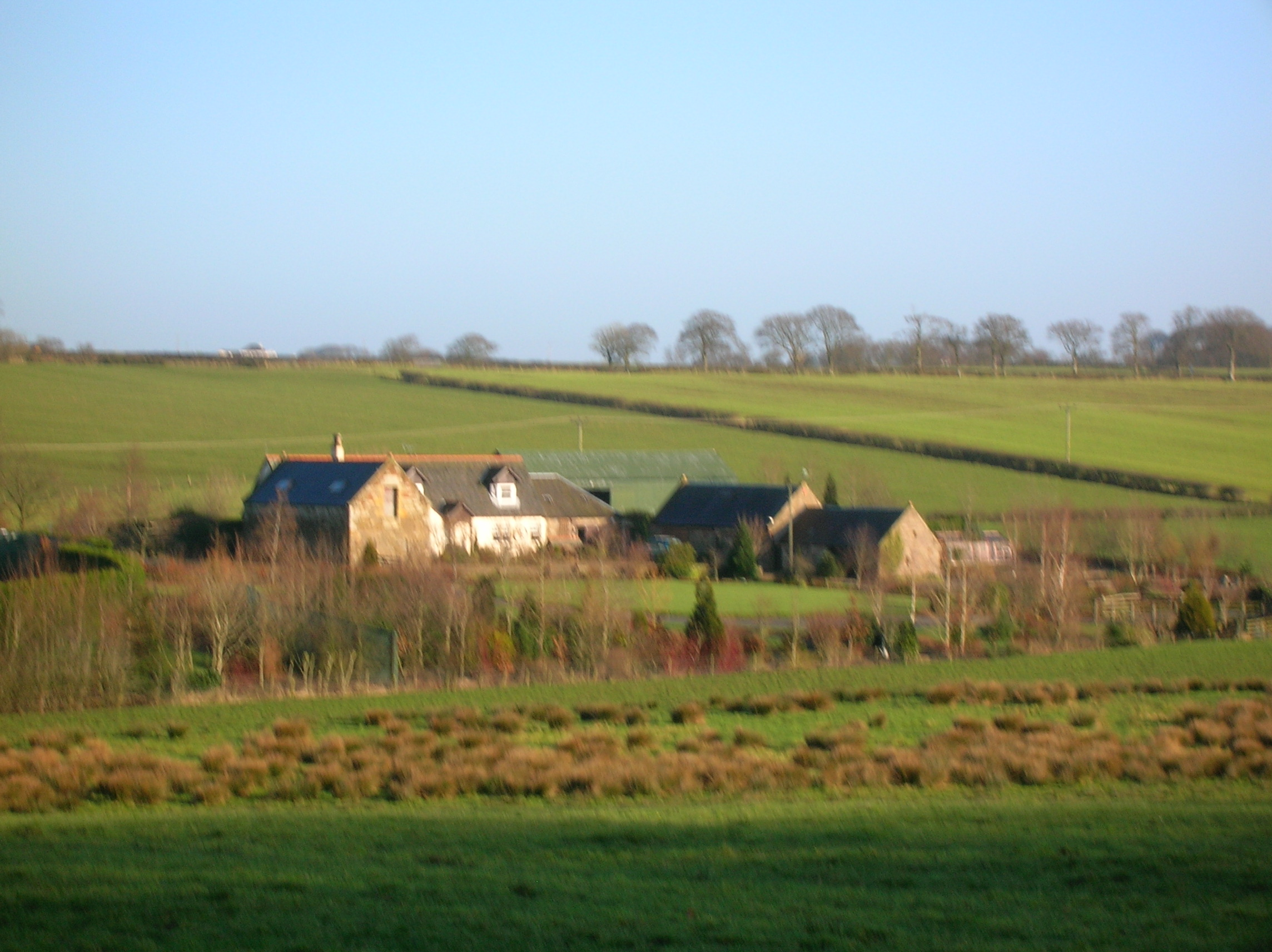
A view of Kirkmuir farm in 2007.

Close to Kirkmuir (previously Laigh Kirkmuir), a farm occupied by William Mure in 1692, is the Freezeland plantation (previously Fold Park) on the turnpike as marked on the 1858 OS. Nowadays it is a smallholding without a dwelling house. The origin of the name is unclear, although 'furz' or furs' is old Scots for gorse or whin, however the existence of this small patch of fenced off land may be linked to the reference in Thomson's 1832 map to a fold, either for sheep or cattle. In 1799 the surrounding field is known as Fold Park. It could have been a pen for strayed stock or be connected with the tolls on the turnpike in some way or a 'stell', the Scot's word for a partial enclosure made by a wall or trees, to serve as a shelter for sheep or cattle. A building may have existed here. Kirkmuir was farmed by John Brown (died 21 August 1880, aged 54) and his wife Catherine Anderson (died 27 August 1895, aged 72). James Walker (died 11 December 1926, aged 86) and his wife Mary Woodburn (died 27 April 1899, aged 57) also farmed Kirkmuir. They were all buried in the Laigh Kirk graveyard.

The field between Kirkmuir & Righead was known as Lady Moss Meadow. Righead was a tollhouse at a later stage, however it was built as a 'butt and ben'. Skirmshaw is the name of some fields nearby in 1797, although no building appears to be present at that time. Picken's (formerly Padzean) Park was across the road from Righead, behind the estate tree boundary. Picken (Padzean) is a fairly common local name (see Kirkhill). Millstone Flat Park is the field above the chalybeate spring on its side of the Ha Ha.through Lady Moss Meadow Kirkmuir was originally a farm on the Longridge Plantation near Highcross Farm (Thomson 1832), later becoming Little Kirkmuir and being marked but not named by 1895, before ceasing to be recorded at all on the OS maps by 1921.

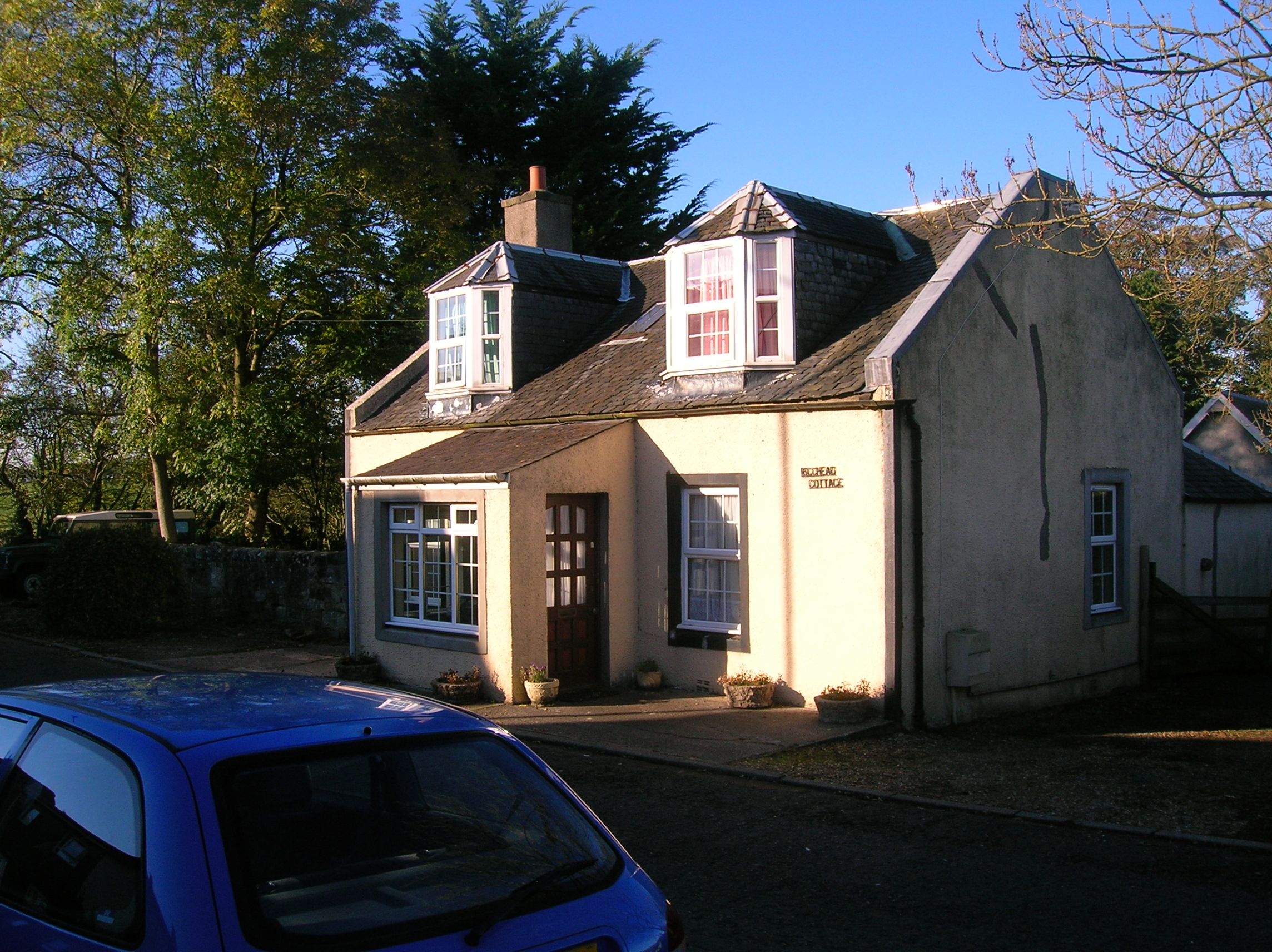
Righead Toll overlooking the old Picken's Park in Lainshaw.

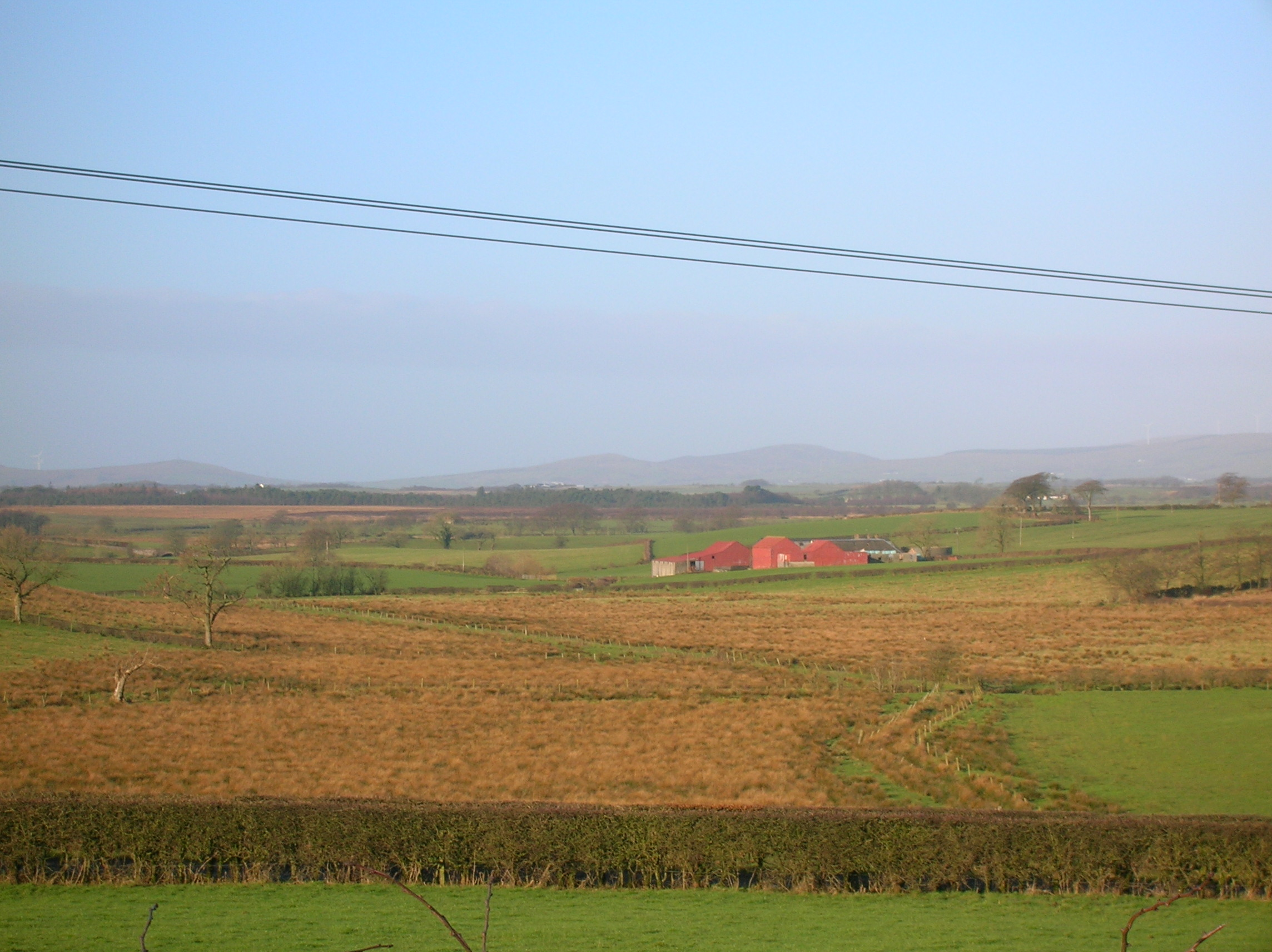
A view across Canaan Park to Bickethall farm in 2007.

A 'Kirkhill' dwelling is last marked on the 1858 and 1895 0S, below Kirkhill and near to South Kilbride. Andrew Picken was the farmer here in 1867, when his spouse, Ann Blair died, aged 59; she was buried at the Laigh Kirk in Stewarton. It was close to a small burn running from Water Plantation, above Stewarton, in a sheltered glen, typical of early religious settlements and the Kirkhill itself, which was wooded in 1858, is an excellent viewpoint. A track led up to it from Gillmill Farm and it had an entrance near that of South Kilbride. Robert Stevenson farmed at Gillmill and died on 27 May 1810, aged 48. In the 1850s, Mr Picking was the tenant, and he was able to identify a site identified by dark soil that had a rectangular & square which had the correct compass points for a church and the ground was very stony. The farm was surrounded by Lainshaw Estate lands.

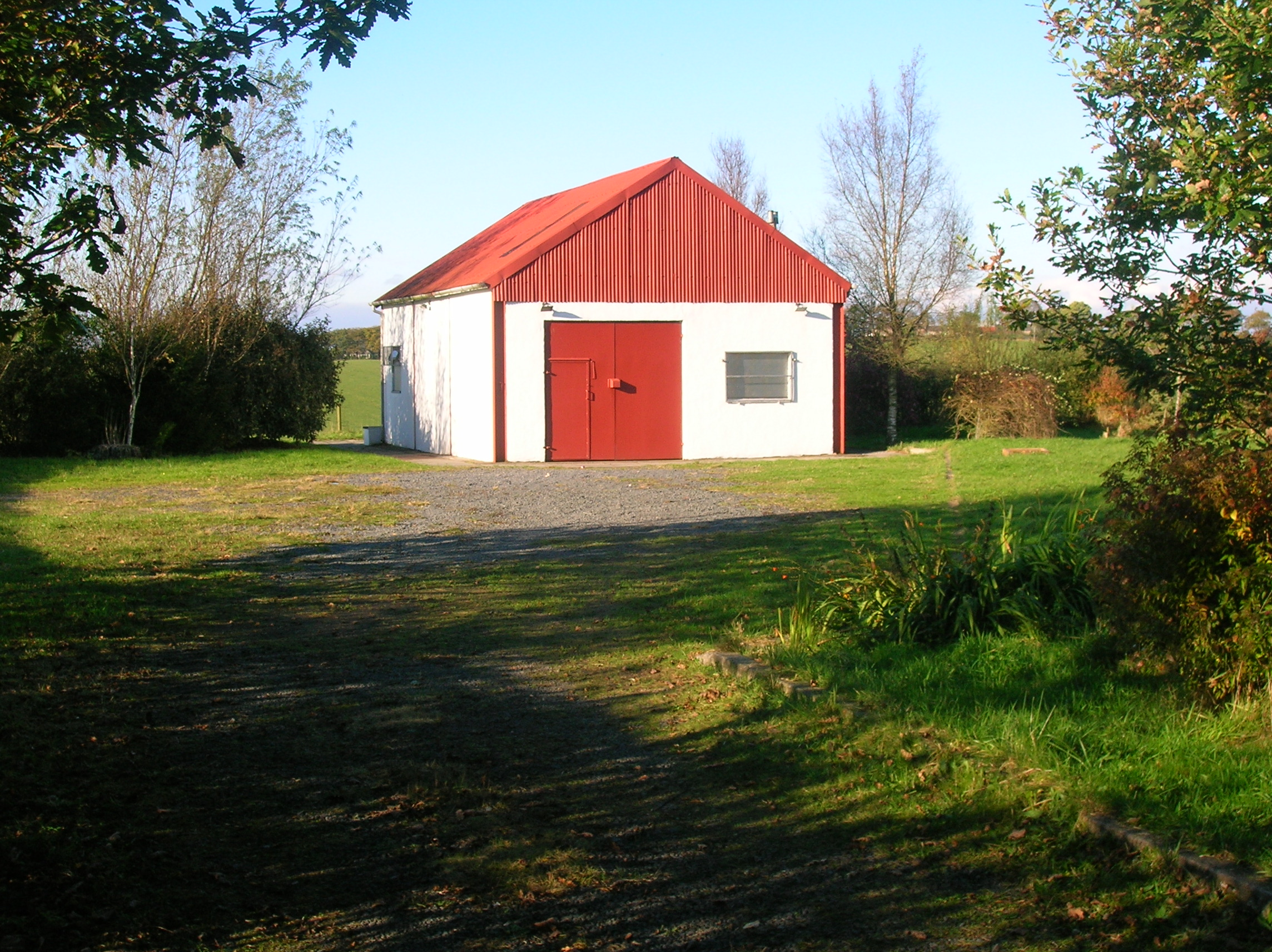
Freezeland smallholding.

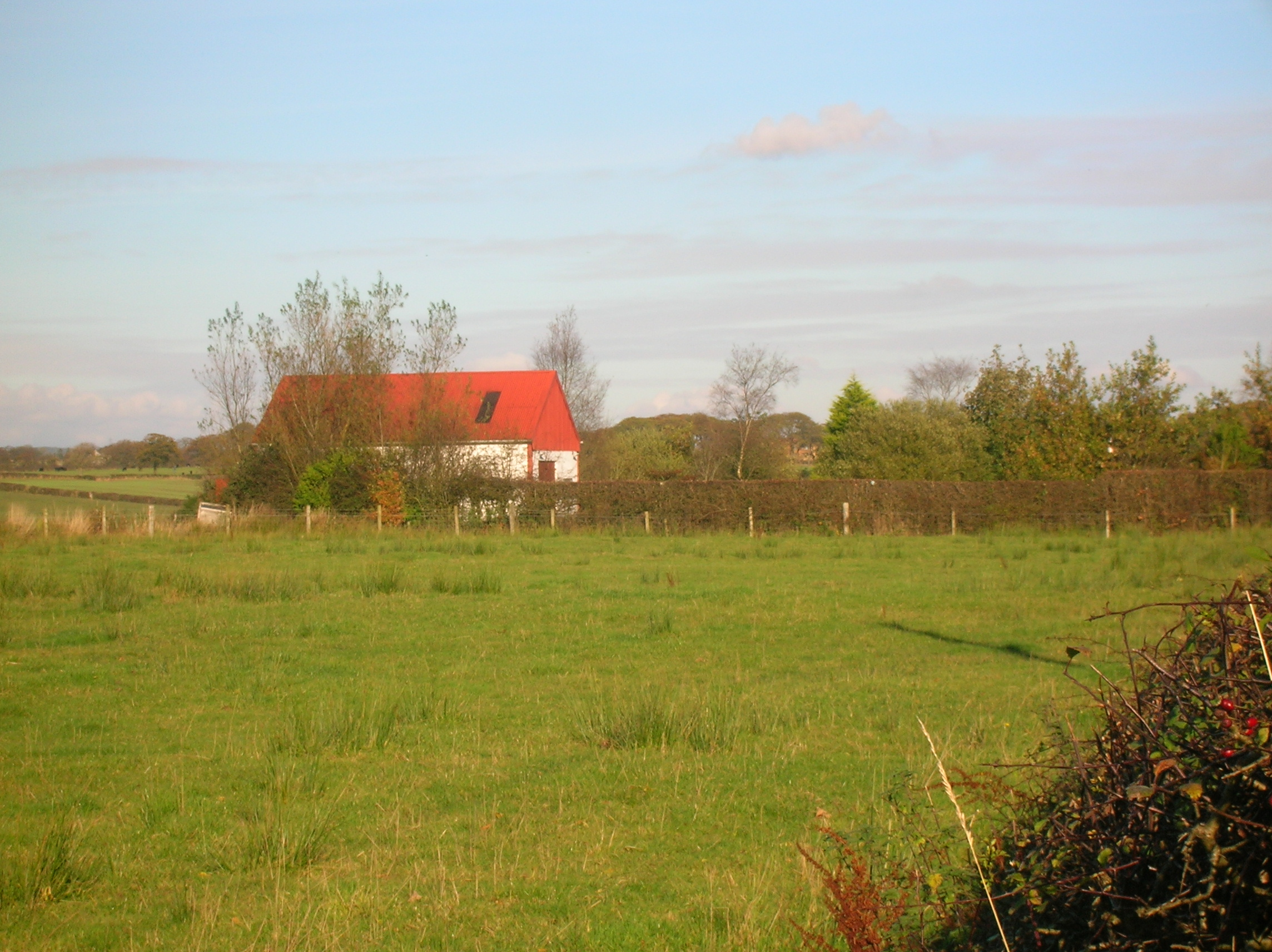
Freezeland smallholding.

The plethora of religious names in this area – the Kirkmuirs, Kirkhill, Lady Moss, High Cross, Canaan and the Kilbrides, suggest that at some point in the distant past a pre-Christian and Christian site was located here. No documentary evidence appears to survive and the earliest record is for Kirkry in 1654, now Kilbride. Bride, Brigit or St. Brigid was originally a Celtic Goddess linked with the festival of Imbolc, the eve of the first of February. She was the goddess of spring and was associated with healing and sacred wells. The Carlin Stone at Commoncrags in Dunlop is associated with the 'old winter hag', the antithesis of the goddess Bride. The name Canaan at Kirkmuir was in use as early as 1779. In 1922 James Martin and Mary Gilmour purchased Gillmill and Canaan from the Cunninghames of Lainshaw.

High Cross was occupied by the Harvies in 1951, who had purchased the farm from the Nairnshaw Estate in 1921. According to Strawhorn they had reconditioned the old thatched farmhouse in 1915 and added a gravitation water supply, bathroom, telephone and electricity. The farm buildings are now (2006) abandoned and the site awaits a new use.

== Mineral wells and the source of the Chapel Burn ==
Paterson (1866) states that there is a mineral spring near Stewarton, called the Bloak Well. Robinson gives the Scot's word 'blout' as meaning the 'eruption of fluid' or a place that is soft or wet. Both meanings would fit in this context. Blout and Bloak are very similar words, with a Bloak Moss not very far away at Auchentiber.

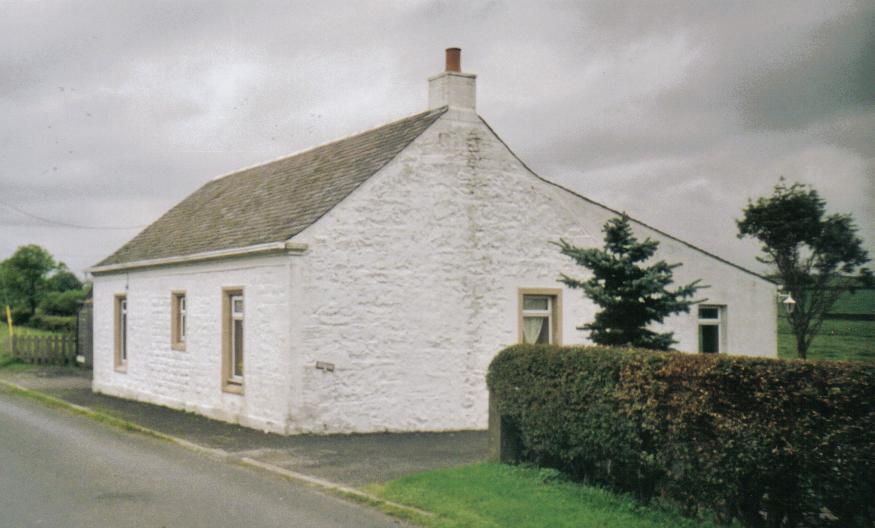
A view of Bloak Well, now called Salt Well in 2006.

A well recorded as Bloak Well was first discovered in 1800, around 1826 (Paterson 1866) or 1810 or 1800, by the fact that pigeons from Lainshaw House and the neighbouring parishes were found to flock here to drink. Mr. Cunningham of Lainshaw built a handsome house over the well in 1833 and appointed a keeper to take care of it as the mineral water was of some value owing to healing properties attributed to it. The well was located in the middle of the kitchen.

The Chapel Burn rises near the Anderson Plantation in the fields below Lainshaw Mains and it is marked as a chalybeate or mineral spring on the 1911 6" OS map. Bore holes nearby suggest that the water was put to a more formal use at one time, supplying cattle troughs or possibly even for a stand pipe as mineral water was popular for its supposed curative properties. According to the opinion of the day, it could cure 'the colic, the melancholy, and the vapours; it made the lean fat, the fat lean; it killed flat worms in the belly, loosened the clammy humours of the body, and dried the over-moist brain. The main spring here has been covered over and the water piped out to the burn.

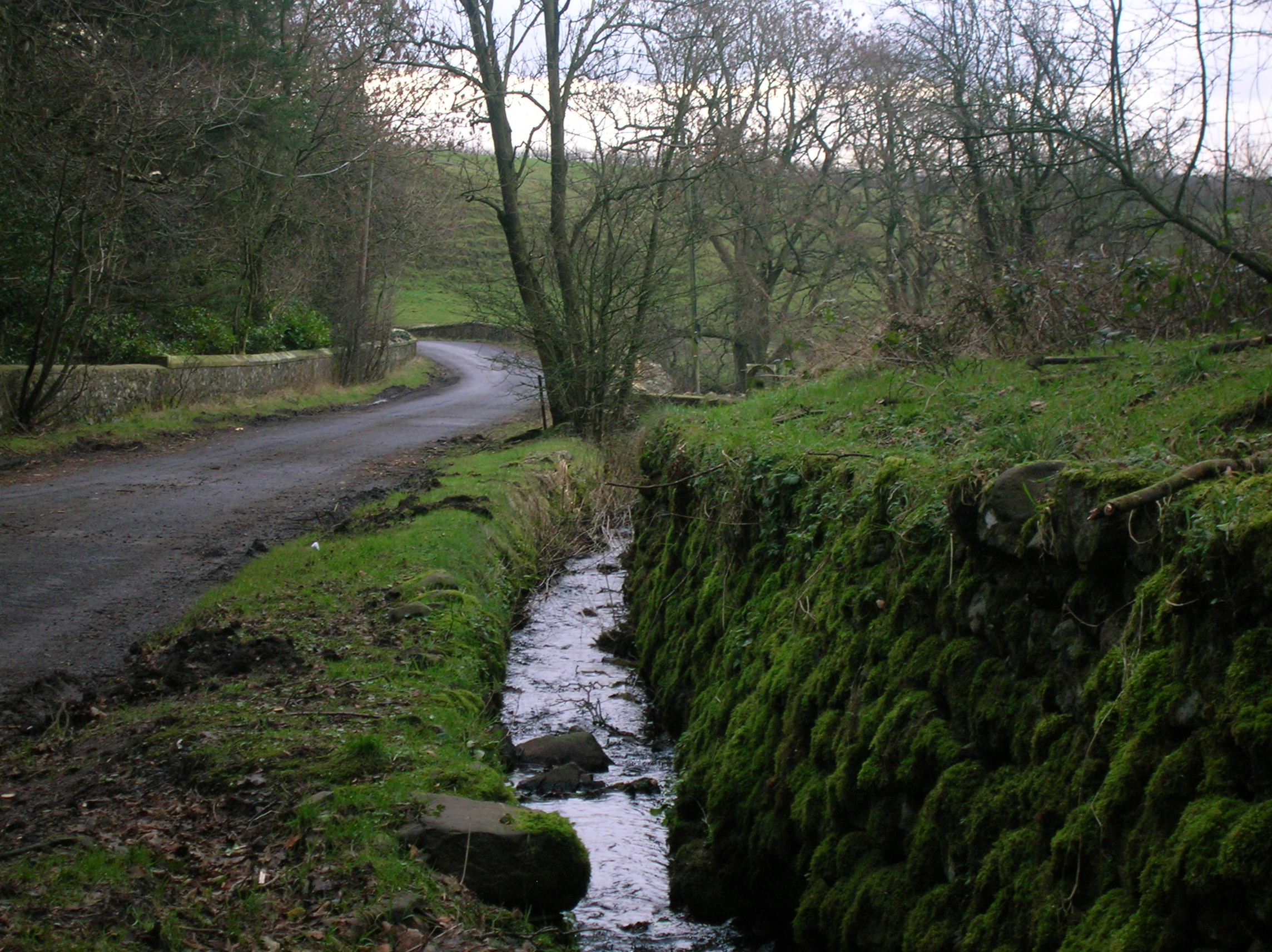
The Chapel Burn near its confluence with the Annick Water.

The chalybeate spring (otherwise known as Siderite, a mineral consisting of iron(II) carbonate, FeCO_{3} – 48 percent iron) described here is not the only well / spring in the area which is identified as being a mineral spring, for there is still a cottage named Saltwell in what was the hamlet of Bloak. This information is stated by the Topographical Dictionary of Scotland, however Mrs. Florence Miller of Saltwell recollects that this well was never known specifically as the Bloak Well. The present building was purchased from the Cunninghames of Lainshaw in the 1920s, having been built between 1800 and 1850. It is thought that the salt well now lies beneath the floor of the building and various physical features of the building suggest that it is the structure built by the Cunninghames. The well was first discovered by the fact that migrating birds, especially swifts and swallows, flocked to it. It is of unknown composition and is not listed as chalybeate. The cottage was a 'but and ben' and it is a 'handsome' building as described by Paterson. A Redwells Farm is located nearby at Auchentiber, the etymology of tiber itself refers to a well.

In 1930 the Kilmarnock Glenfield Ramblers' Society record a Ramble during which they walked past the well known local spring, its waters rich in iron, on their way to the Kennox Estate, having already visited the Lainshaw Estate. This must be the source of the Chapel Burn.

== The March Dyke and a dispute between neighbours ==
The Chapeltoun march is a significant historic survival in an Ayrshire context and in addition we have some information about its construction. Defence for James Wilson Sued by John Miller 7th. August 1820. Manuscript and personal communications. We are told in 1820 that "the march dyke was built some many years ago when such boundaries were quite a new thing and thought by some to be rather an incovenience". Ditchers were employed to build it and thorns and trees were purchased to plant on it. The word fence is used as well as dyke in regards of the construction method. Part of the march dyke is still clearly indicated by a large coppiced beech and we know that this coppicing or pollarding was done because such 'marker' trees will live considerably longer than trees which have been left untouched.

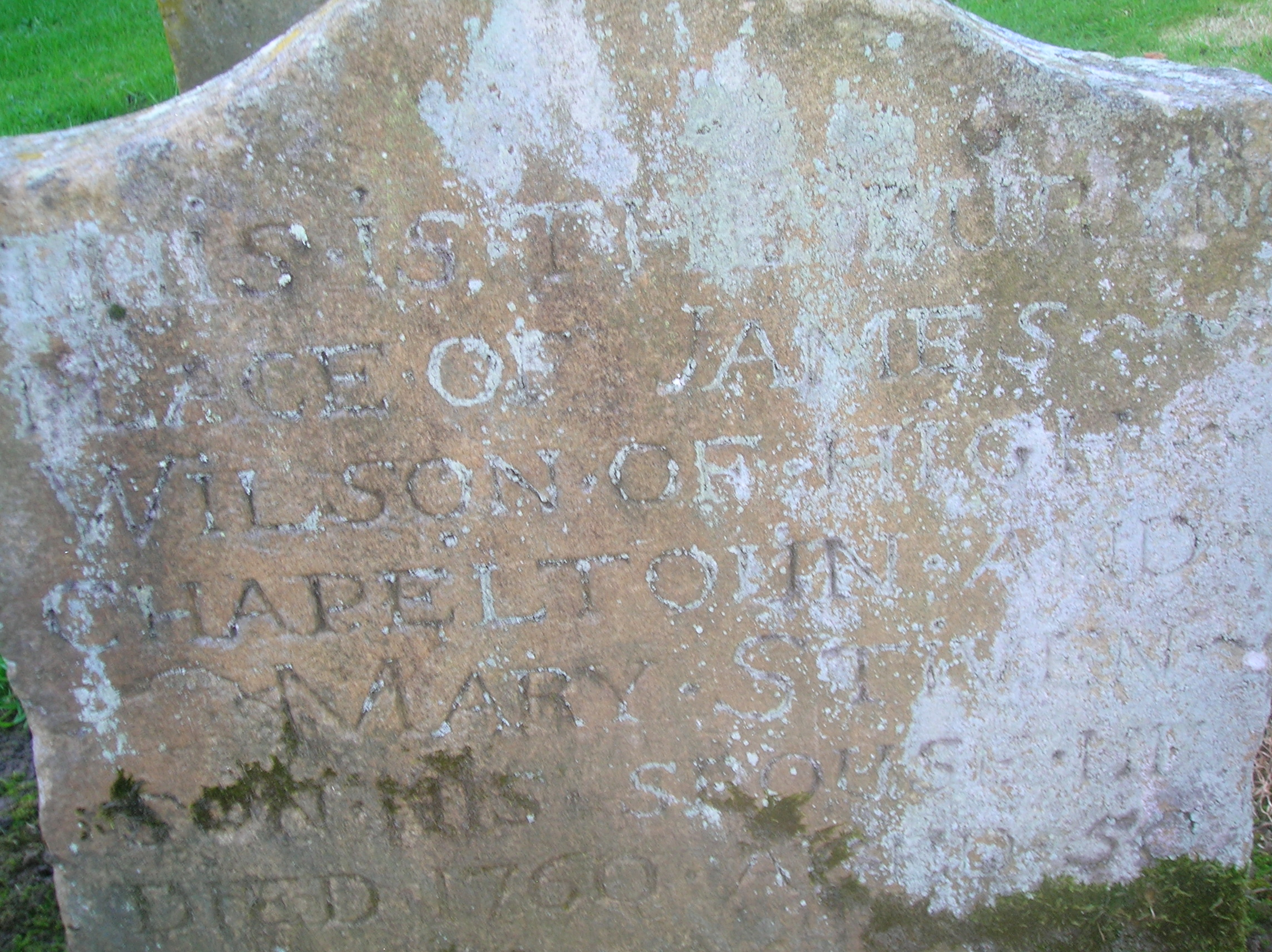
The Wilson family grave at the Laigh Kirk in Stewarton.

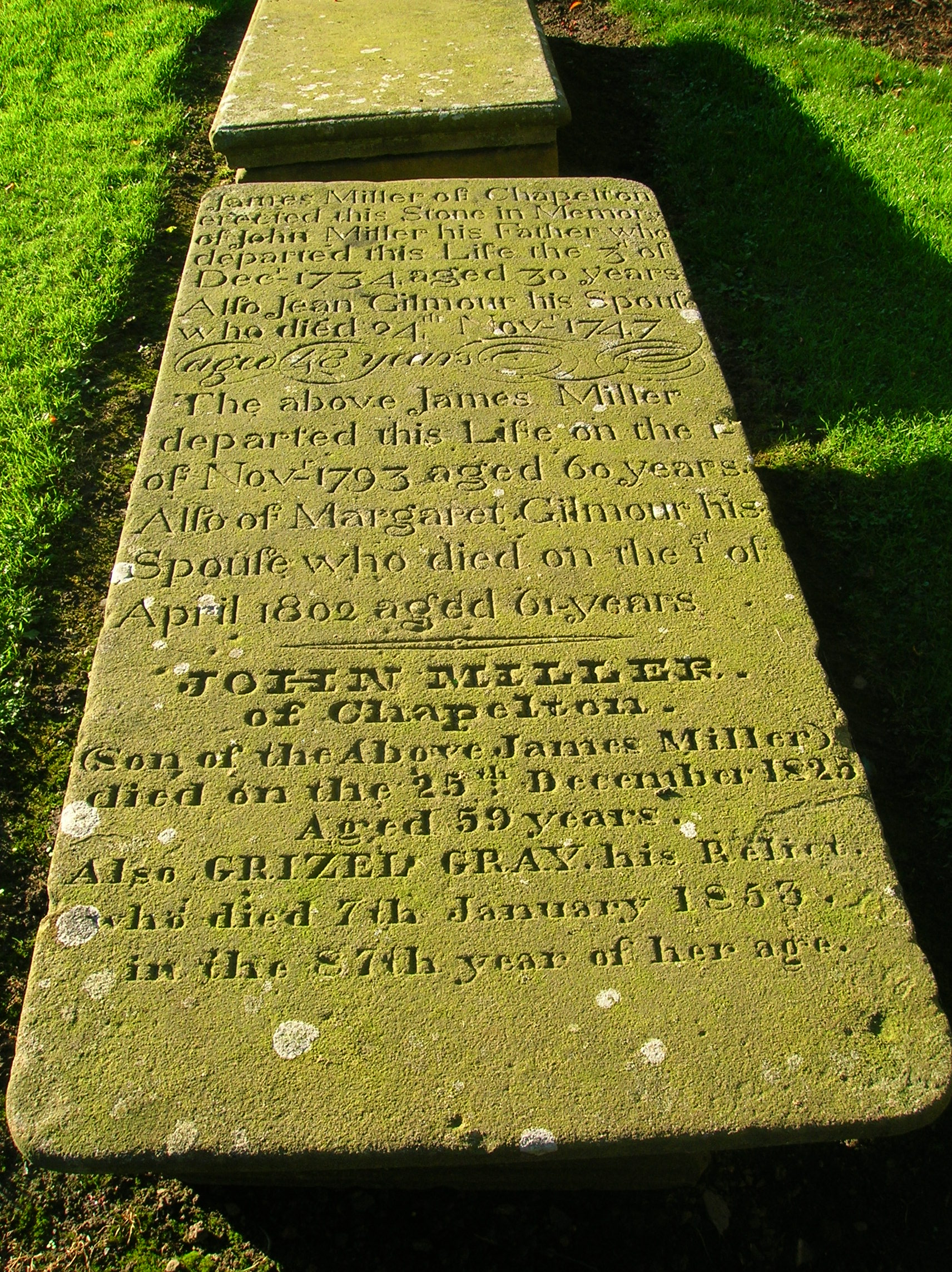
The Miller family grave at the Laigh Kirk in Stewarton.

James Wilson of High Chapelton and John Miller of Laigh Chapelton went to court over the matter of the march dyke built between their lands by the father of James. The document makes it clear that such inclosures were unusual at the time and although John's father very reluctantly agreed to the march dyke being built with a straightening of the old boundary, he did not pay anything towards its construction or for its maintenance, despite the march being of a level of construction which required skilled ditchers to be employed for the task.

The ill-feeling seems to have spread into the next generation for James records that John has cut 'march' trees down in the past and has thrown thorns and brambles from the march into the High Chapeltoun's hayfields. The irony is that John of Laigh Chapelton is suing James for cutting down trees from the march dyke and requires money to plant new trees and to compensate for the inconvenience he has been put through. We do not know the outcome, however the action is described as "trifling and frivolous". The clue to the ill-feeling may be in the term 'straightening' which may imply that John's father agreed to a new march which may have resulted in some small loss of his lands.

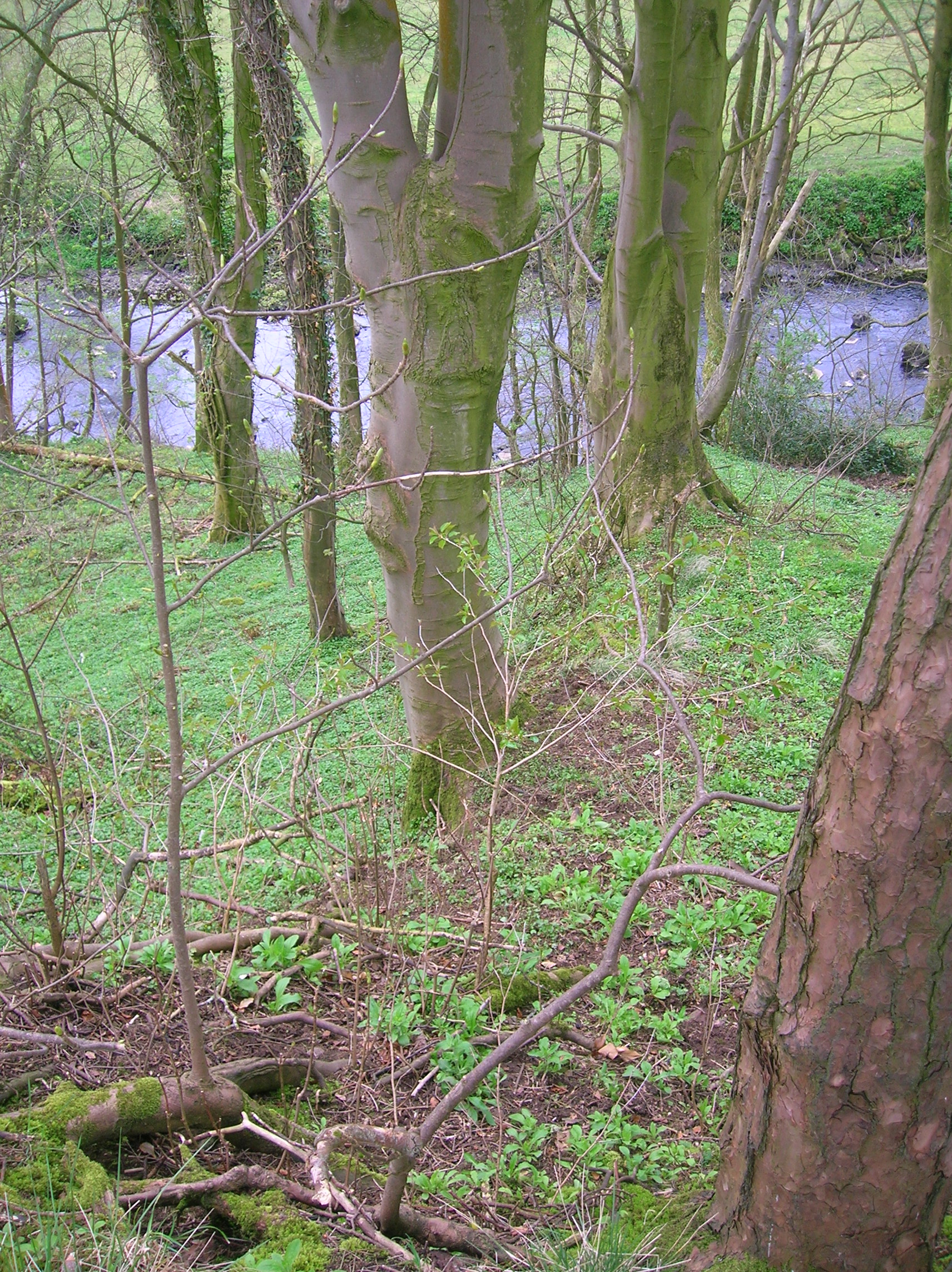
Part of the disputed Lambroughton March.

The rental value of High Chapelton was £137 in 1820 and Laigh Chapelton was £180. The memorial stone to the Miller family of Chapelton (Chapelton is the spelling on the tombstone) is very well preserved at the Laigh Kirk, Stewarton. John Miller died on 3 December 1734, aged 30, and his spouse, Jean Gilmour died on 24 November 1747, aged 42. Their son James died on 1 November 1793, aged 60, and his spouse, Margaret Gilmour, died on 1 April 1802, aged 61. Their son John is the one involved in the dispute; he died on 25 December 1825, aged 59. His spouse was Grizel Gray, who died on 7 January 1855.

The march dyke is clearly marked on the 1885 OS map, following the course of the bank above the water meadow from the riverside and then running up as a 'v' shape towards High Chapeltoun before coming back down to join the lane near the Chapel mound. It doesn't follow the line of the natural ridge above the waterside meadow.

Aiton in 1811 mentions "a curious notion that has long prevailed in the County of Ayr, and elsewhere, that the wool of sheep was pernicious to the growth of thorns" (hawthorn or whitethorn and blackthorn or sloe).

== Other sites of interest in the area ==
=== Crivoch Mill ===
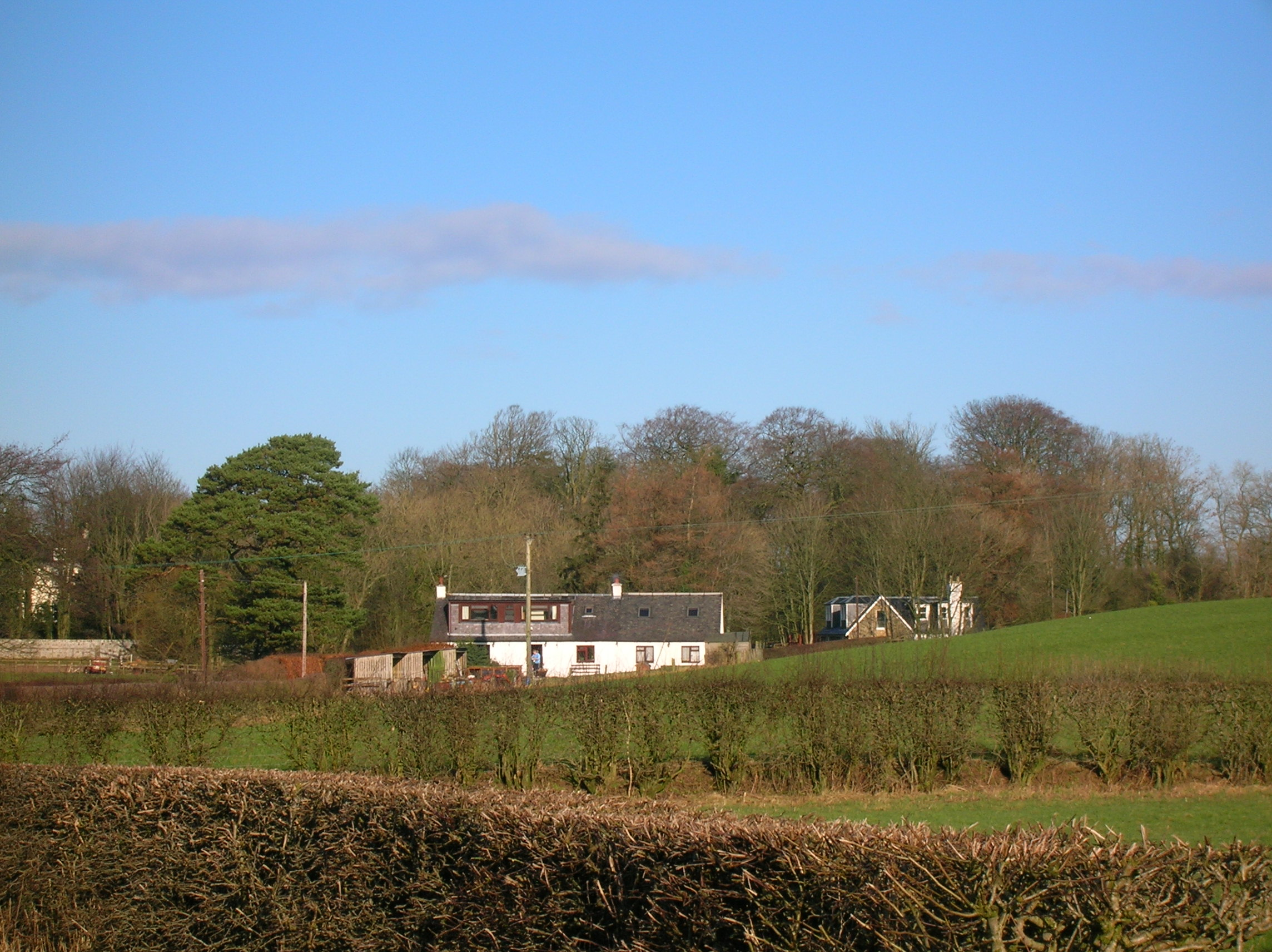
Crivoch Cottage with the Kennox estate in the background

Etymology
The name Crevoch most likely derives from the Scots Gaelic for place of the trees, indicating that a substantial wooded area existed in the locality in times past.

Crivoch or Crevoch (also Crevock in 1821) mill, part of which was recently (2005) rebuilt as Angel Cottage, a family home, was the site of a Mill and associated miller's dwelling, byre, etc. as far back as 1678. 'Cruive' is Scots for a pen for livestock.

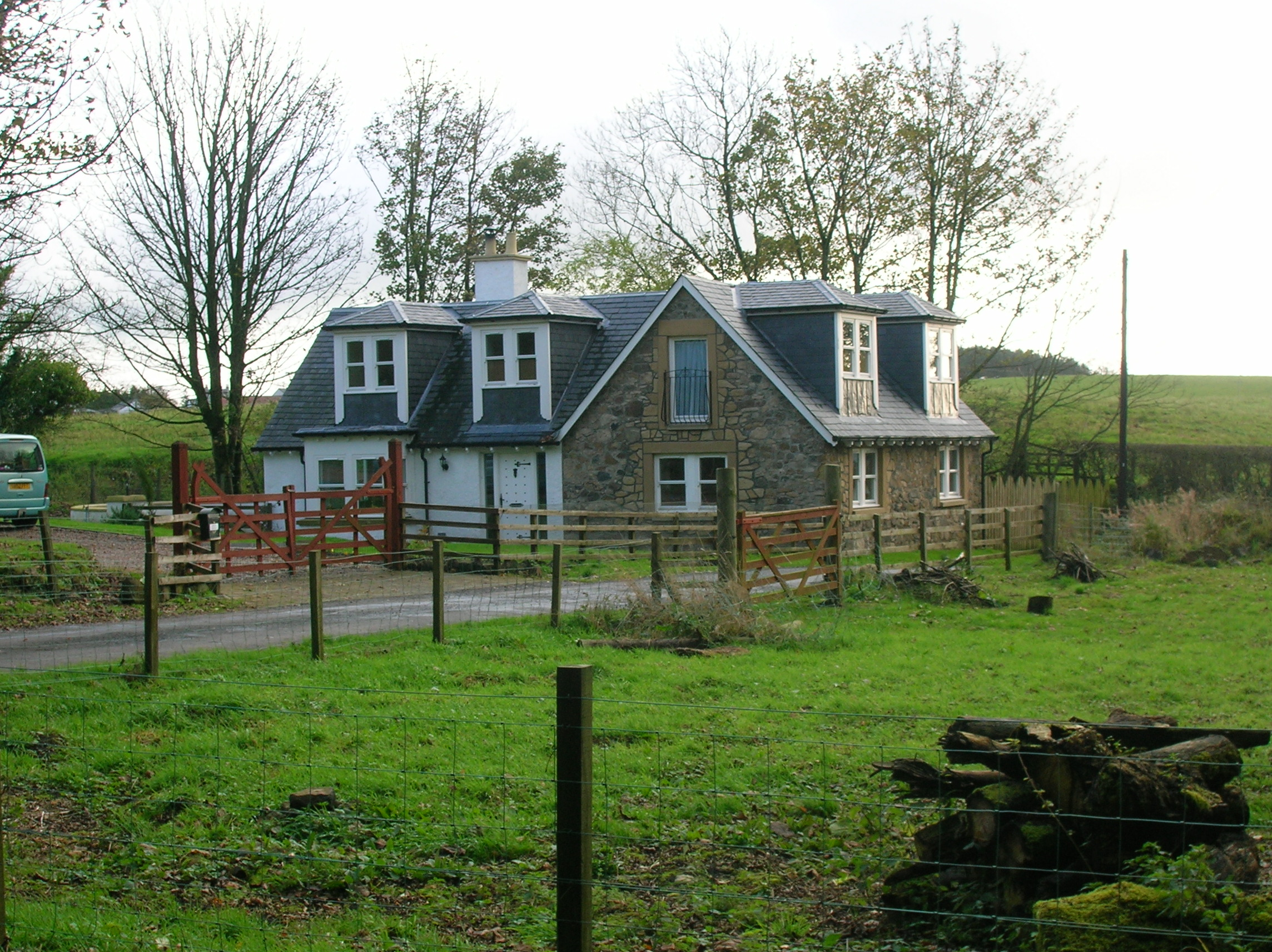
Angel Cottage in 2007 at Crivoch.

The old cornmill was part of the Barony of Crevoch and lay in the portion which was called Crivoch-Lindsay. In 1608 Archibald Lindsay was heir to Andrew Lindsay the owner, however by 1617 the lands were in the hands of James Dunlop, whose father was James Dunlop of that Ilk. In January 1678 Robert Cunynghame, apothecary / druggist in Edinburgh, is stated to be the heir to Anne, daughter of Sir Robert Cunynghame of Auchenharvie. She was his cousin-german and part of the inheritance was the 5 merk land of Fairlie-Crivoch and the mill. He also owned some of the lands of Lambroughton and Auchenharvie near Cunninghamhead / Perceton. A Robert and Jonet Galt are recorded as living at Crivoch in around 1668. In 1742 William Millar, Baillie, was 'Milner in Crivoch Miln'.

The mother of the late Mrs. Minnie Hastings of West Lambroughton Farm had been one of the last occupants of the house at the Crevoch Mill site. The family name was Kerr. A track led from Crivoch up to Bottoms farm and this gave access through to Chapeltoun. The full name of Bottoms farm is Bottoms at Point Crivoch. The dusky cranesbill, a rare garden escape, was recorded by the Glenfield Ramblers' at Crivoch mill in the 1850s and was still growing at the site in 2004.

In 1735 John Cummin, a schoolmaster, is recorded as living at Crivoch.

=== The Gallowayford Cists and Farm ===
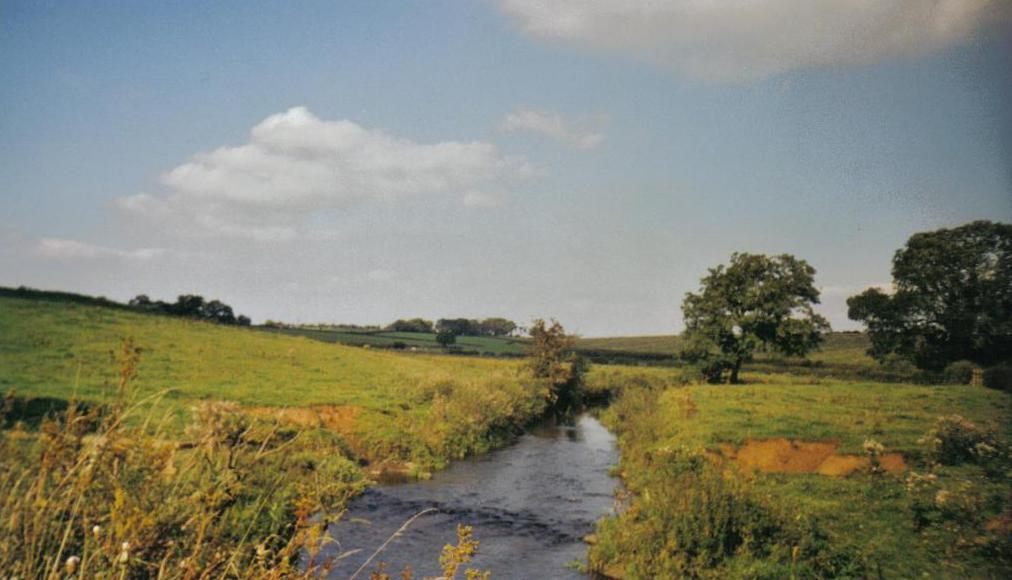
A view of the Glazert at Gallowayford.

Etymology
Gallowayford derives its name from the gallows which were positioned here in feudal times. McAlister made this point to the Kilmarnock Glenfield Ramblers on one of their visits. It is possible that a dule tree was used as the gallows.

At Gallowayford near Kennox is the site of the discovery in 1850 of stone-lined graves about 3 feet (0.91 m) square, in a group of tumuli, in which were found two urns containing flint arrowheads and some 'Druid's glass' beads. Charles McAlister Esq. of Kennox House, the laird, had ordered these graves to be opened and examined. The flints and the eleven beads (probably made of amber) have been lost after having been taken into the keeping of the laird. They had at least been photographed and sketched by a visitor in the 1920s. The urns were also feared lost; however, it was found that they had been recorded under Loup and not Kennox (as the owner was Laird of both places) in the record of the National Museum of Antiquities of Scotland. In 1949 they had been purchased from the estate. This find is one of the very few where two urns were found in the same cist, and the assemblage of grave goods is unusual. Gallowayford Farm is no longer in existence; however, the remains of the dam or weir in the Glazert nearby can be clearly seen. Robertson (1820) regards this as being a valuable property, the proprietor being James Millar, with a valued rent of £21.

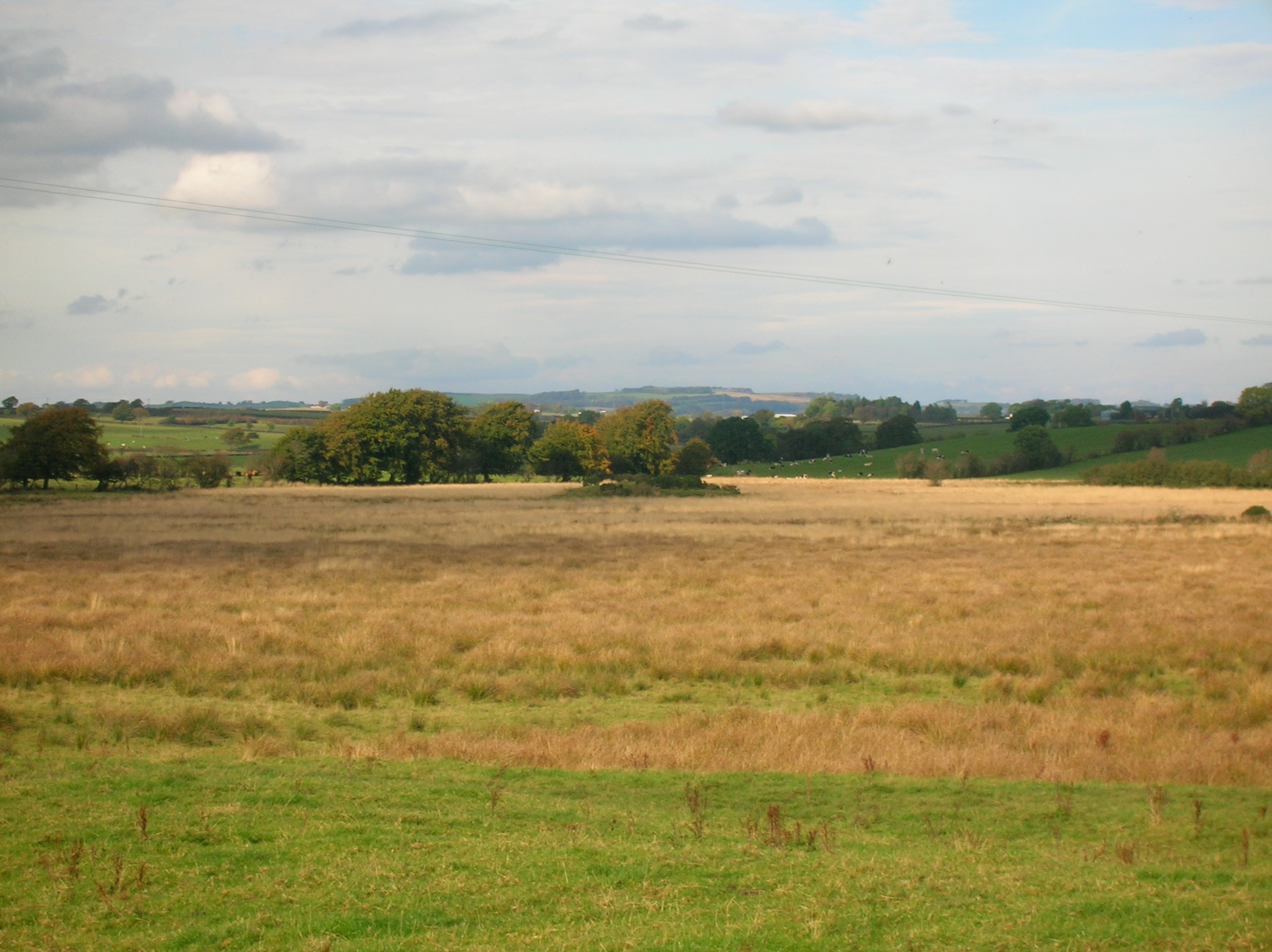
A distant view of the enigmatic Mound Wood on Kennox Moss in 2007

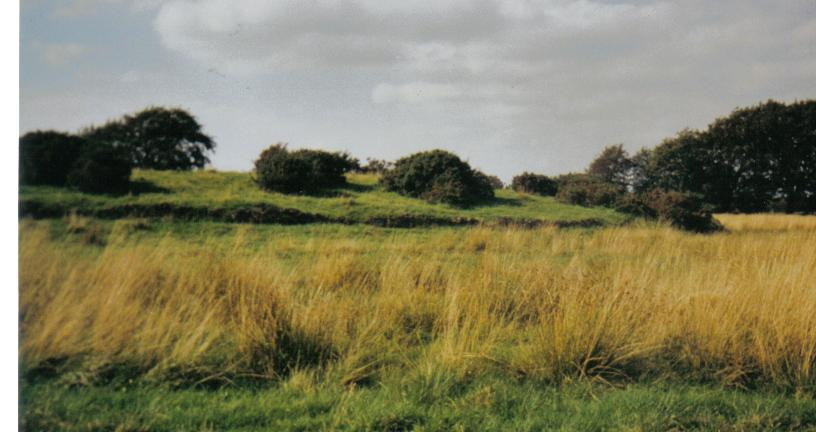
A view of the enigmatic Mound Wood on Kennox Moss in 2006

Close to the cists site is the Mound Wood on Kennox Moss, an oval shaped artificial structure made of piled turf and surrounded by a well constructed drystone wall. It has not been investigated archaeologically. An access track ran up to it at one time and Roy's map of 1747 indicates that a dwelling known as Water House existed in this vicinity at that time.

The Gallowayford Farmhouse is now (2006) just a jumble of stones, however John Shields and his spouse Jean Guthrie farmed here in the mid-19th century, Jean dying on 4 October 1887 and John on 22 September 1908; they lost a daughter, Isabella at the age of 4 in 1862. James Miller farmed here previously, dying on 3 April 1813. They are all buried at the Laigh Kirk in Stewarton. General Roy's map of 1747–55 clearly shows Gallowayford and Irvinhill.

=== Bonshaw ===
Bonshaw (formerly Bollingshaw or Bonstonshaw) was a small estate and barony of the Boyd's, a cadet of the Boyds, Lords of Kilmarnock.

=== Stacklawhill ===
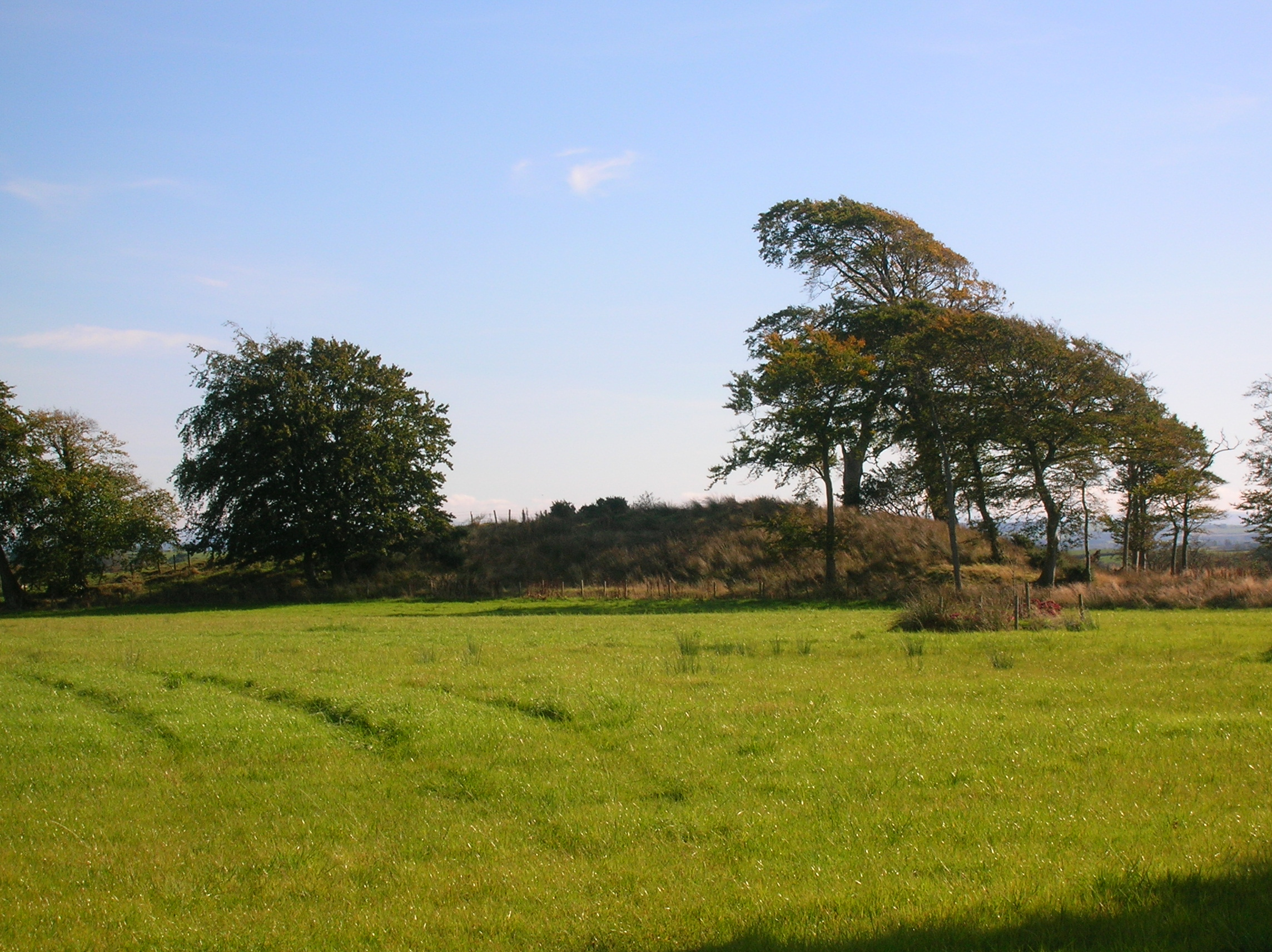
The possible moot or gallows hill at Stacklawhill.

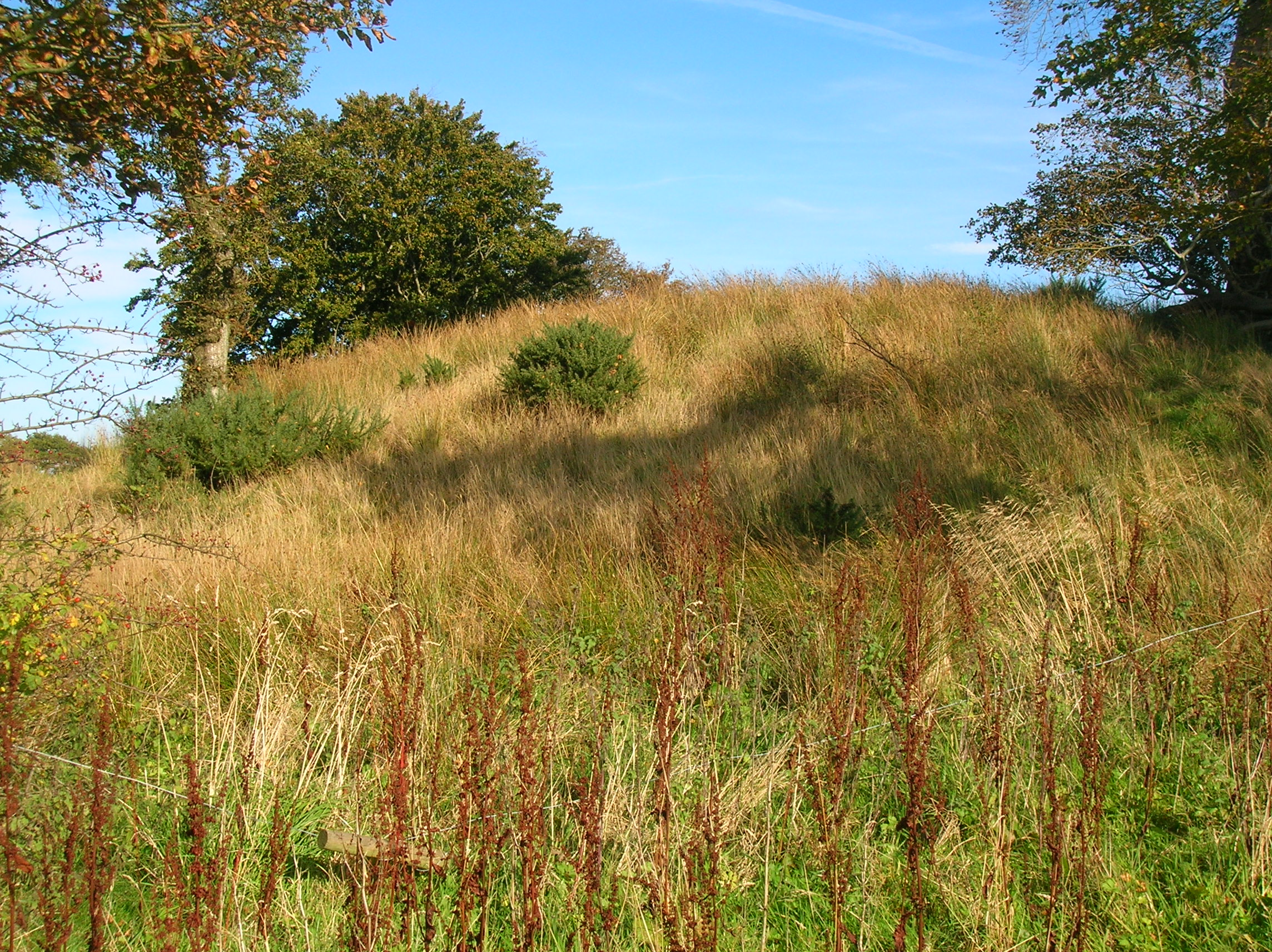
The possible moot or gallows hill at Stacklawhill.

Near Stacklawhill is the site of the discovery of celts (axe heads) and earthenware in 1875. John Craufurd Taylor is recorded as living at Stackly hill in 1735. Mr Muir of Bonnyton farm was the great-grandson of Mr Thomas Reid of Stacklawhill farm who had owned the Bonnyton estate in 1827. The properties of Mossend Huist and Bogue were incorporated within Stacklawhill.

=== Bankend or Sandilands Farm ===
The 1764 coat of arms of the Sandilands, Lords Torphichen

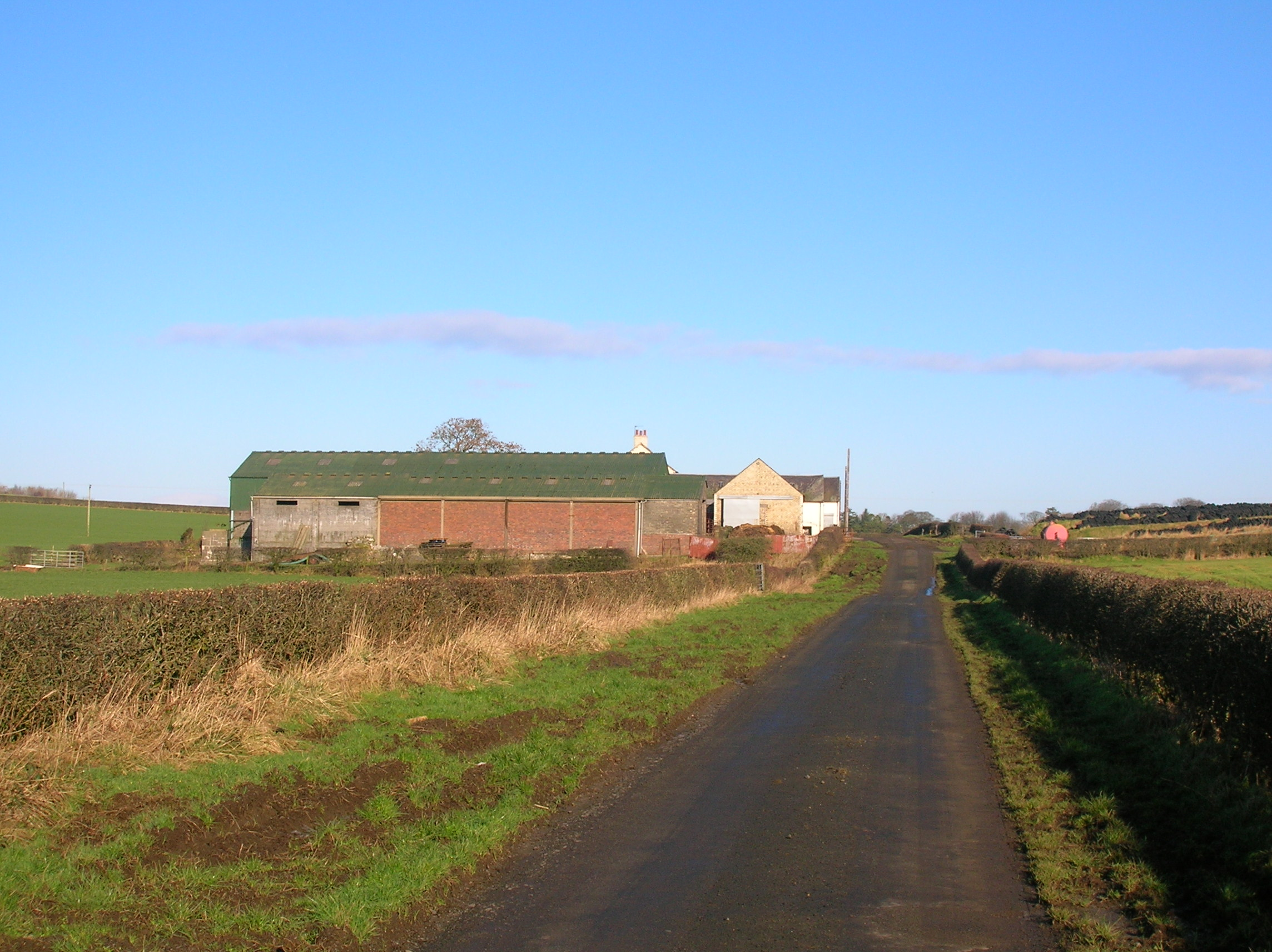
A view of Bankend Farm from the Glazert

Bankend Farm near the Annick is marked on the 1775 Armstrong's map, however it shown as a ruin as far back as 1858. Its name was transferred to the farm of Sandilands sometime after 1923 and the name Sandielands (1820), Sandilands or Sandylands dropped, 'apart' from the cottage nearby which uses the name Sandbank. Nothing of old Bankend remains on the site, the rubble now being located on the riverbank. A Hugh Watt lived here in the 18th century. The Sandilands family, with the title Lord Torphichen, held the temple-lands and this would have included "the chapel lands and glebe of Fairlie-Crivoch." The soil in these parts is not sandy and the land ownership may very well be the explanation for the origin of the placename given the connection between the Sandylands or Sandilands family and the former Knights Templar estates. The Lainshaw Estate plan of 1779–91 by William Crawford for William Cunningham Esq. names the area as Sandylands and marks a steading called Sandiriggs. The farms of Bankend and Sandylands became combined as the property of Sandilands.

A ford crossed the river at this point, the road then running up the hill to West Lambroughton. This was an important crossing as no bridge, road or ford existed at Chapeltoun until possibly the time of the building of Chapelton House in the 1850s.

=== Clonbeith Castle ===
Given as 'Klonbyith' by Pont in the 1690s Clonbeith was then the property of William Cuninghame, Scion of this cadet branch of the Glencairn Cuninghames through those of Aiket Castle. John Cuninghame shot and killed the Earl of Eglinton in 1586 and was caught and 'cut to pieces' in Hamilton, possibly at Hamilton palace.

The Cowlinn burn runs down to join the Lugton Water at the site of Montgreenan castle or the Bishop's Palace. A dwelling called Cowlinn is marked on the Thomson's 1820 map and a Clonbeith Mill was nearby.

== Stewarton area local and social history ==
Limekilns are a common feature of the area and limestone was quarried in a number of places, such as at Stacklawhill. Limekilns seem to have come into regular use about the 18th century and were located at Stacklawhill, Haysmuir, Bonshaw, High Chapeltoun, Bloomridge (Blinridge in 1828), Gillmill, Sandylands (now Bank End) and Crossgates. Large limestone blocks were used for building but the smaller pieces were burnt, using coal dug in the parish to produce lime which was a useful commodity in various ways: it could be spread on the fields to reduce acidity, for lime-mortar in buildings or for lime-washing on farm buildings. It was regarded as cleansing agent. A number of small whinstone, sand and sandstone quarries were also present in the area and brick clay was excavated near Kirkmuir.

Aiton in 1811 comments on the growing of carrots by William Cunningham of Lainshaw as an 'excellent article of food for the human species'. This was one of the first estates to grow them in quantity.

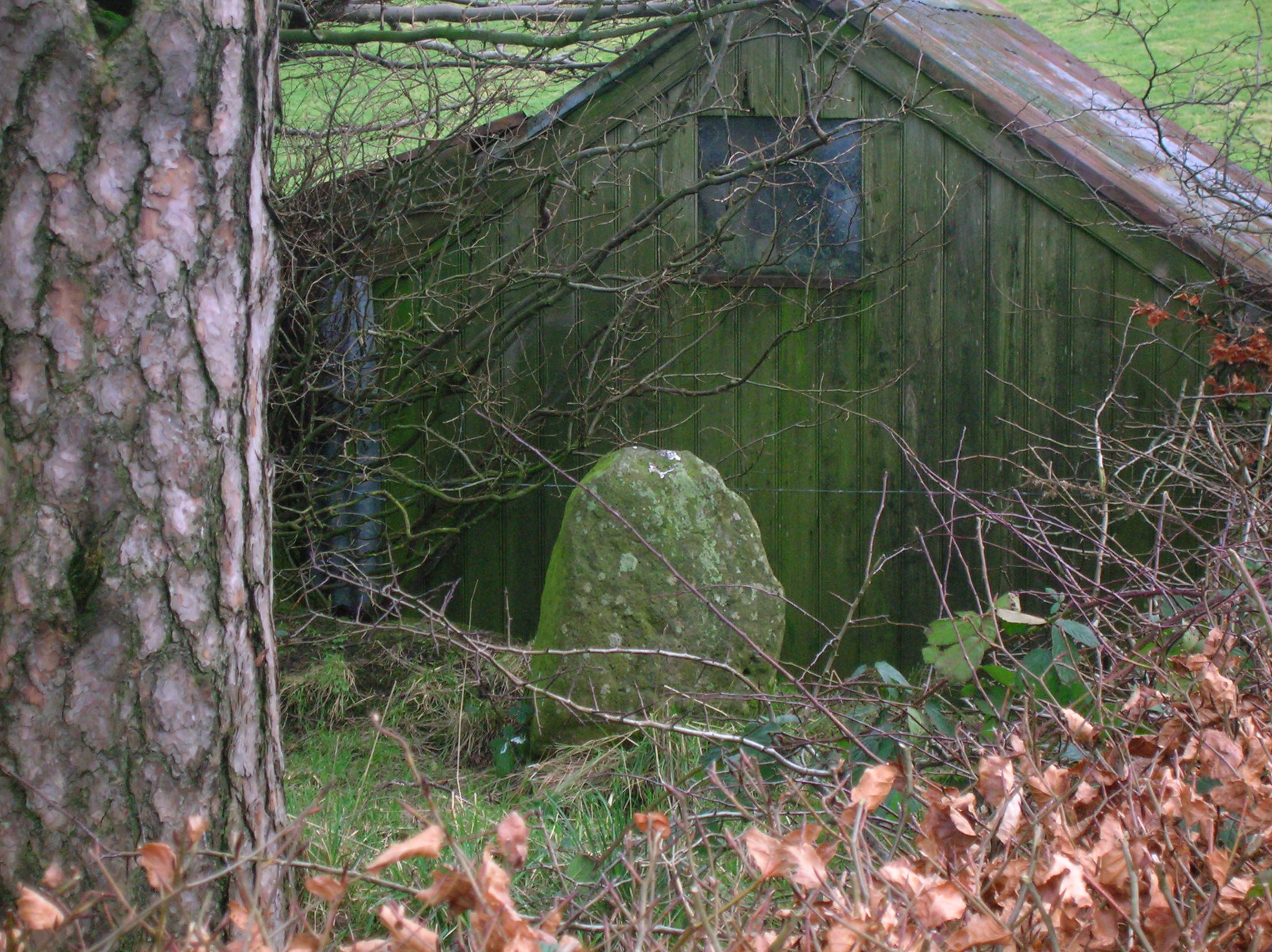
A small standing stone in Firbank Plantation.

In 1820 only six people were qualified to vote as freeholders in Stewarton Parish, being proprietors of Robertland (Hunter Blair), Kirkhill (Col. J. S. Barns), Kennox (McAlester), Lainshaw (Cunninghame), Lochridge (Stewart) and Corsehill (Montgomery Cunninghame).

The Gallery of Modern Art (GOMA) is a neo-classical building in Royal Exchange Square in the Glasgow city centre, which was built in 1778 as the townhouse of William Cunninghame of Lainshaw, a wealthy tobacco lord. The building has undergone a series of different uses; It was used by the Royal Bank of Scotland; it then became the Royal Exchange. Reconstruction for this use resulted in many additions to the building, namely the Corinthian pillars to the Queen Street facade, the cupola above and the large hall to the rear of the old house.

Shoes were only used for Sunday best and for many of the younger folk going bare foot was the order of the day. The family at High Chapeltoun were one of the last to do this on a day to day basis.

The Royal Mail re-organised its postal districts in the 1930s and at that point many hamlets and localities ceased to exist officially, such as Chapeltoun, Lambroughton and other areas in Stewarton district.

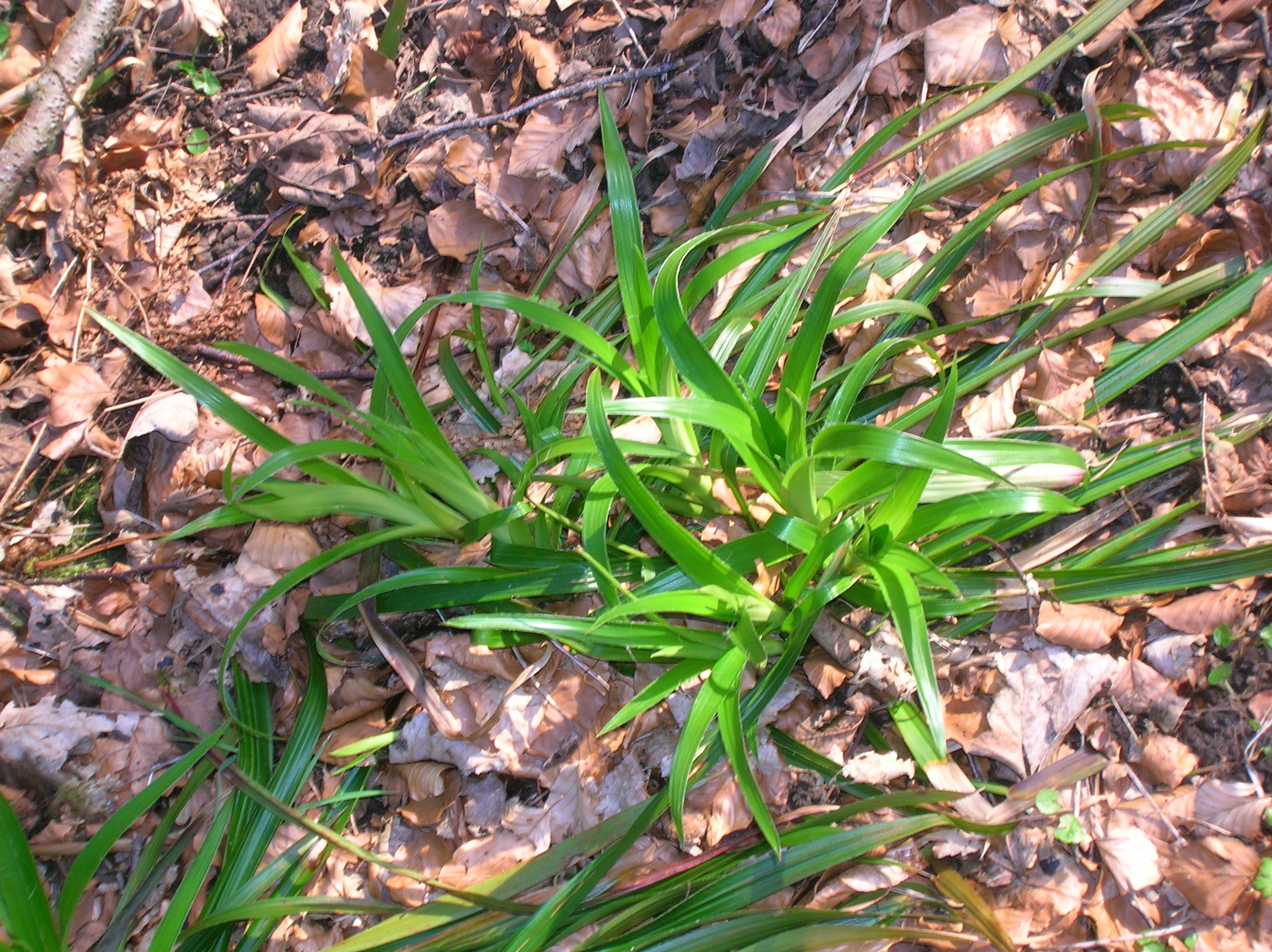
Greater woodrush (Luzula sylvatica)in spring.

James Boswell of Auchinleck House, the famous biographer and friend of Dr. Samuel Johnson was married to his cousin Margaret Montgomerie in Lainshaw Castle. He had gone to Ireland with Margaret, with the intention of courting another wealthy cousin, however he fell in love with the penniless Margaret and married her instead. The room they were married in was one floor above the room in which the Earl of Eglinton was laid after he was murdered by Cunninghame at the old brig or ford on the Annick Water near the entrance to the castle on the Stewarton road. David Montgomery of Lainshaw married a daughter of Lord Auchinleck.

John Kerr of Stewarton built the first practical beehive in the World in 1819, octagonal in shape with a bee-space and a queen separator introduced by 1849. The shape was thought to be closest to the natural tree-trunk shape which bees were thought to favour. L. L. Langstroth is often credited with these developments, however an examination of the records shows that John Kerr, a cabinet maker, was the first to use these features in a working hive. Beeboles and straw skeps were used previous to these developments and here the bees had to be killed to obtain the honey. Running from Anderson's Plantation across the hill and back down to the old driveway near to the walled garden is a wall or dyke replacing a tree lined hedge shown in 1858. The wall or dyke is very unusual in that it is made from roughly equal sized rounded whinstones and it is held together by cement. A great deal of expense and effort would have been needed to build this long section of dyke, which seems to have been in place by 1911.

The estate wall running from near Freezeland to near the Law Mount was built by unemployed labourers in the early 19th century.

Rudolf Hess's Messerschmitt Bf 110 was spotted by locals as he flew on his mission from Nazi Germany to meet with the Duke of Hamilton in 1941. He crashed in Eaglesham on Floors Farm.

== See also ==
- Cunninghamhead
- Lambroughton
- Corsehill
- A Researcher's Guide to Local History terminology
- Cunninghamhead, Perceton and Annick Lodge
- Stewarton

== Bibliography ==
1. Aitken, John (1829). A Survey of the Parishes of Cunningham. Pub. Beith. p. 276.
2. Aiton, William (1811). General View of the Agriculture of Ayr. Pub. Glasgow.
3. Adamson, Archibald R. (1875). Rambles Round Kilmarnock. Pub. T.Stevenson, pp. 168–170.
4. Bayne, John F. (1935). Dunlop Parish – A History of Church, Parish, and Nobility. Pub. T.& A. Constable, pp. 10–16.
5. Davis, Michael C. (1991). The Castles and Mansions of Ayrshire. Pub. Spindrift Press, Ardrishaig, Pps. 206 & 207.
6. Edinburgh Gazette. No.3655. Friday, 13 April. 1828.
7. Fullarton, John (1858). Topographical Account of the District of Cunningham, Ayrshire compiled about the year 1600. by Mr. Timothy Pont. Glasgow : Maitland Club.
8. Groome, Francis H. (1885). Ordnance Gazetteer of Scotland: A Survey of Scottish Topography. V.6. p. 381.
9. MacIntosh, John (1894). Ayrshire Nights Entertainments: A Descriptive Guide to the History, traditions, Antiquities, etc. of the County of Ayr. Pub. Kilmarnock. p. 195.
10. Name Book of the Ordnance Survey (1856). No.58, pp. 58–9,
11. Pont, Timothy (1604). Cuninghamia. Pub. J.Blaeu in 1654.
12. Robertson, George (1823). A Genealogical Account of the Principal Families in Ayrshire, more particularly in Cunninghame. Vol.1. Pub. Irvine.
13. Sanderson, Margaret H.B. (1997). Ayrshire and the reformation 1490–1600. ISBN 1-898410-91-7.
14. Strawhorn, John and Boyd, William (1951). The Third Statistical Account of Scotland. Ayrshire. Pub. Edinburgh.
