= Kingsford =

Kingsford may refer to:

== Places ==
Australia

- Kingsford, New South Wales
- Kingsford, South Australia

United Kingdom

- Kingsford, Worcestershire, England
- Kingsford, near Stewarton, Ayrshire in Scotland

United States of America

- Kingsford, Michigan
- Kingsford Heights, Indiana

== Other uses ==
- Kingsford (name)
- Kingsford (charcoal), a commercial brand of charcoal
- Kingsford's, a brand of corn starch
- Kingsford Community School, a secondary school in London
- Kingsford Smith International Airport, official name of Sydney Airport
