= KCS =

KCS may refer to:

== Schools ==
- Kanawha County Schools, West Virginia
- Kennet School, a state school in south east England
- Kihei Charter School, in Kihei, Maui, Hawaii
- King's College School, an independent day school in south west London, England
- King's College School, a day school in Madrid, Spain operated by King's Group
- Kingsford Community School, an east London secondary school

== Science and technology ==
- Keratoconjunctivitis sicca
- Killed carbon steel
- kilocycles per second, another name for kilohertz
- Kansas City standard, a standard for encoding binary data on tape used by many early microcomputers
- Knowledge-centered support, a service delivery method
- Keyboard Controller Style, an interface often used in the Intelligent Platform Management Interface architecture
- Korean Chemical Society
- Very-long-chain 3-oxoacyl-CoA synthase, an enzyme

== Other ==
- Czechoslovak koruna, a unit of currency abbreviated Kcs
- Clinical Centre of Serbia, a medical center in Serbia, third largest in the world
- Kansas City Southern Railway, an American railroad
  - Kansas City Southern (company), its parent company from 1887 to 2023
- KCSF, formerly KCS radio station
- King's Colour Squadron, the unit of the Royal Air Force that safeguards the King's Colour
