= Barony and Castle of Corsehill =

Barony in East Ayrshire, Scotland

Corsehill Castle
- Stewarton, East Ayrshire, Scotland; GB grid reference NS255564, 620506
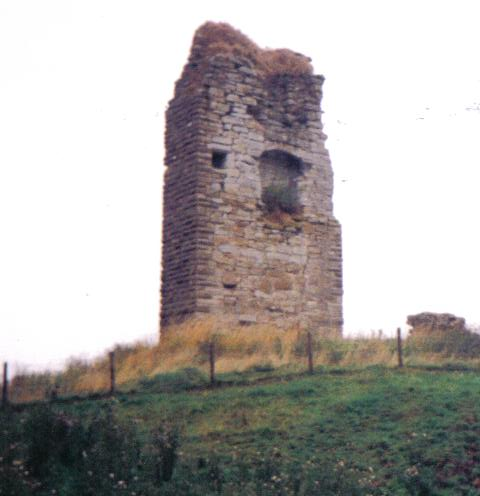
- The remains of Corsehill Castle

Site information
- Owner: Private
- Open to the public: No
- Condition: Ruin

Location
- Shown within Scotland
- Coordinates: 55.686787°N 4.519261°W

Site history
- Built: 16th Century
- Built by: Cunningham
- Materials: Stone

The old Barony and castle of Corsehill lay within the feudal Baillerie of Cunninghame, near Stewarton, now East Ayrshire, Scotland.

== The Lairds of Corsehill ==
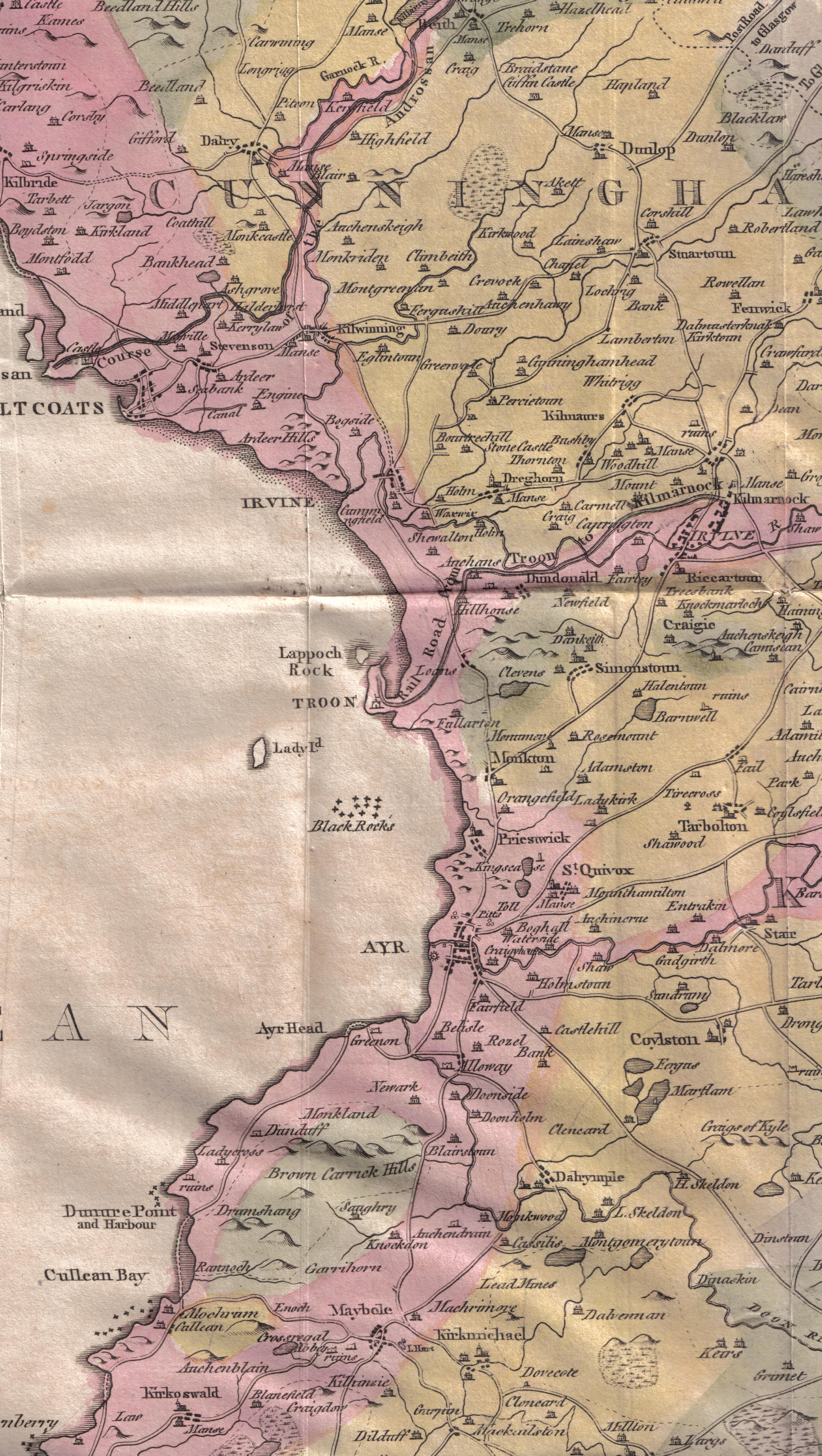
William Aiton's 1811 map showing Stewarton, Corsehill and the lands around.

Godfrey de Ross was an early holder of the castle and lands of Corsehill, moving his seat here from the castle at Boarland (also 'Borland') or Dunlop hill. The De Ross family are now represented by the Earls of Glasgow.

Andrew Cunningham, second son of William Cunningham, 4th Earl of Glencairn, was the first of the House of Corsehill in 1532. In 1532 his father had granted to him the lands of Doura, Potterton, Little Robertland, and the two Corsehills. In 1538 he was also granted Cuttiswray, Clarklands, et Hillhouse. He was a great supporter of the reform movement and had his lands forfeited, later returned and died in 1545. Cuthbert Cunningham, son of Andrew, inherited and married Matilda 'Maud' Cunningham of Aiket Castle. He had two sons, Alexander and Patrick, the latter being involved in the murder of Hugh, Earl of Eglinton. Patrick was murdered in revenge by the Montgomeries. The spelling 'Cunningham' will be used throughout for consistency where it stands alone.

Alexander Cunningham inherited and married Marion Porterfield of Duchal. Alexander's son, also Alexander, held the lands of Lambruchton and Thirdpart in 1622 and died in 1667, being succeeded by his grandson, another Alexander Cunningham, who was given the dignity of a baronet in 1672. In 1626 Alexander Cunningham senior of Corsehill is recorded. In 1691 the Hearth Tax records show the 'House of Corsehill' as having ten hearths and suggests that 83 other dwellings were in the barony. David Cunningham was the last to occupy Corsehill House and he then lived at Doura Hall near Kilwinning where he had proposed building himself a new laird's house.

In 1685, Alexander, the 2nd baronet, married Margaret Boyle, sister of the Earl of Glasgow. Their son David married Penelope Montgomerie, daughter of Sir Walter Montgomerie of Skelmorlie Castle. Their eldest son married the heiress of Sir David Montgomerie of Lainshaw and adopted the patronym Montgomerie-Cuninghame, however he predeceased his father and it was his son Walter, who never married, that inherited in 1770 and died in March 1814. His brother David became the 5th baronet and also died unmarried in 1814. James, the third brother, inherited and married Jessie, daughter of James Cuming of Earnside, Nairnshire. Sir James died in 1837 and Alexander David inherited, however being unmarried his brother Thomas inherited and married Charlotte, daughter of Hugh Hutcheson of Southfield in Renfrewshire.

In 1820 the Corsehill lands included Bonshaw, High and Low Chapeltoun, Lainshaw, Kirkwood, Sandielands, Bankend, Gallowayford and Corsehill. In 1832 Sir Thomas Montgomerie-Cuninghame of Corsehill and Kirton-holme (near Lanark) was the eighth baronet, marrying Charlotte Niven Doig Hutchison, grand-niece of William Niven of Maybole, who left her much of his wealth, this being over £100,000.

Sir William James Montgomery Cuninghame was the ninth baronet of Corsehill and Kirltonholme. He is buried at Kirkmichael in South Ayrshire. He was born in 1834 and died on 11 November 1897. His wife Elizabeth is also buried at Kirkmichael and died on 12 February 1936.

William was awarded a Victoria Cross in the Crimean War. He had served as a lieutenant in the 1st Battalion, The Rifle Brigade (Prince Consort's Own). On November 20, 1854, he was with a party detailed to drive the Russians from some rifle pits. After dark they launched a surprise attack and the Russian riflemen were forced to move from their cover. The officer in command was killed. However, the two soldiers withstood several counter-attacks during the night until relieved the next day.

William rose to the rank of colonel, was an MP for Ayr Burghs from 1874 to 1880. His Victoria Cross is held by the Royal Green Jackets Museum, Winchester.

The Montgomery-Cuninghame of Corsehill Baronets are still extant, with Sir John Montgomery Cuninghame of Corsehill and Kirton-holme, 12th. Baronet now representing the family, head of the Clan Cunninghame. With no male heir, however the title can pass through the female line.

=== Old Corsehill Castle and Corsehill House ===
In A.D. 1451 the Registrum Magni Sigilli, records in Stewartoune (sic), Ayrshire, "Le Mote de Casteltoune." Some considerable confusion exists about the sites and naming of these 'castles' in Stewarton. The printed name 'Revincraige' arose as a printed spelling error from the original manuscript's 'Reuinscraige' i.e. stone ruins, so it isn't a name, it's a description used in the locality. Dobie goes on to state that following the correction "that the real and original name of this castle ... was Ruincraig cannot for a moment be entertained..."

We know from historical records about Godfrey de Ross and his family of Corsehill Castle, they were Lords of Liddesdale in the Borders and later on the Cunninghams became the holders. The later Corsehill (also Crosshill) House stood on the east side of the Corsehill or Clerkland Burn and only a few remains were said to exist to show its site, however the 1860 OS indicates no ruins of any description and nothing now remains on the site (2015).

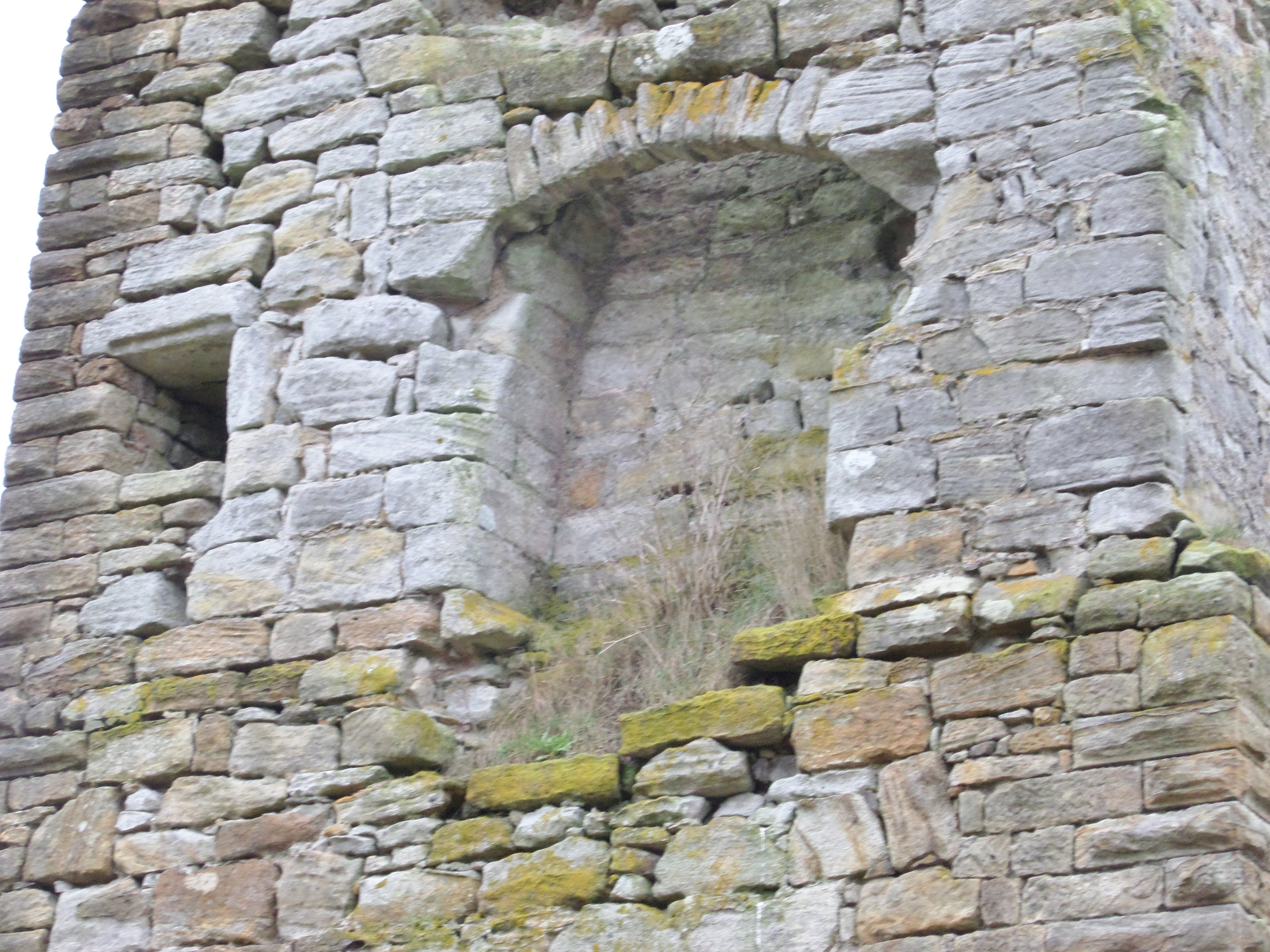
The fireplace, flue and an aumbry.

Etymology
The name Corsehill most likely derives from Cross Hill, a name sometimes used for it. In the early days of Christian Scotland crosses, usually wooden, were erected in prominent positions and religious observance would take place when the priest visited. Later churches were built and the crosses abandoned.

Corsehill House is shown in one old print of 1791, drawn in 1789 by Grose with the comment that "At a small distance from this ruin are some small remains of a more ancient building belonging to the same family." referring to the old Corsehill castle whilst drawing Corsehill House, the home of the laird at that time. Substantial remains of Corsehill House were thought to exist until the railway was constructed and that most of the ruins were used to build the embankment with the course of the burn also being partly altered at this time, however a contemporary record states that the Corsehill House site had been entirely robbed by circa 1800. Armstrong's 1775 map clearly shows Corsehill as being on the east bank of the Corsehill Burn.

The single section of tower wall that remains today (2020) of Corsehill Castle has had extensive consolidation works to stabilise it and this gives it its unusual appearance, accentuated by the existence of a fireplace and aumbry on the eastern side. The Ardrossan and Saltcoats Herald from 28.11.1863 records that "Much of its beauty as a ruin was unfortunately destroyed a few years ago. The proprietor, from an idea that it might fall or be blown over in a storm, very wisely gave orders to have it strengthened; but the mason who executed the work, either from a want of taste, or from ignorance, converted it into the pillar-like object that we can see at present". The proprietor in question was Sir Thomas Montgomery Cunningham of Corsehill whose wife restored the family monument in Kilmaurs's Glencairn Aisle. The dressed stone work blocks suggests that two phases of consolidation were carried out, possibly years apart. The lower level appears as possible robbed dressed ashlar from Corsehill House, and the second phase is distinguished by a raised rectangular area, typically intended to emphasise that this is not original work.

A number of authors have assumed that the surviving remnant of the typical tower castle equates to a distinctive part of Grose's engraving however the thickness at nearly 3 metres and the other features such as the lack of a fire-place and aumbry, of this clearly later building together with map evidence suggests otherwise and in addition the OS map evidence suggests a typical square or oblong tower castle shaped building rather than a relatively unfortified laird's house with relatively thin walls, many doors at ground level, large windows, etc. akin to buildings such as the Place of Auchinleck. Canmore gives measurements for the Corsehill Castle tower remnant as nearly 3m thick and 10m high. If the 'tower' in Frances Grose's engraving was that of the castle then the wall remnants associated with it would have to be at least 10m high and six or more stone courses thick, which the engraving does not show. With these measurements Corsehill House would have been a very large building indeed. The footprint of Corshill House as shown by the engraving also seems far too large for the knoll on which the surviving remnant of Old Corsehill Castle still stands. The 1779 map by Crawford does not indisputably show Corsehill as a ruin although by this time the lands of Cocklebie have extended across the once prestigious avenue of trees.

Fullarton in 1858 records that "..the ancient castellated mansion of Coreshill has been wholly removed – not a stone now remaining to mark its site; nor does any vestige of its garden or other decorations remain to procalim its former state and fallen grandeur.". He goes on to state that the site was well remembered, the last parts of the building having been removed around 1800 and that a fine avenue of magnificent trees used to run down into Stewarton.

Herman Moll's map of 1745 shows a 'Reuinsk' to the west of the Clerkland Burn and 'Corshill' to the west of it whilst Roy's map of 1747 shows a square shaped 'Old Crosshill' with a U-shaped 'Crosshill' to the west of the burn together with a 'mains' farm. Armstrong's 1775 map shows 'Ruins' and 'Corshill' depicted as a house standing to the west of it.

Dobie categorically states that no records in Ayrshire exist of a 'Ravencraig Castle' and goes on to record that the building on the west side of the Corsehill Burn has been a ruin since 1608 and that the area it stands in was once called Corsehill Park. It is worth noting that the Scots for a raven (Corvus corax) is a 'Corbie'.

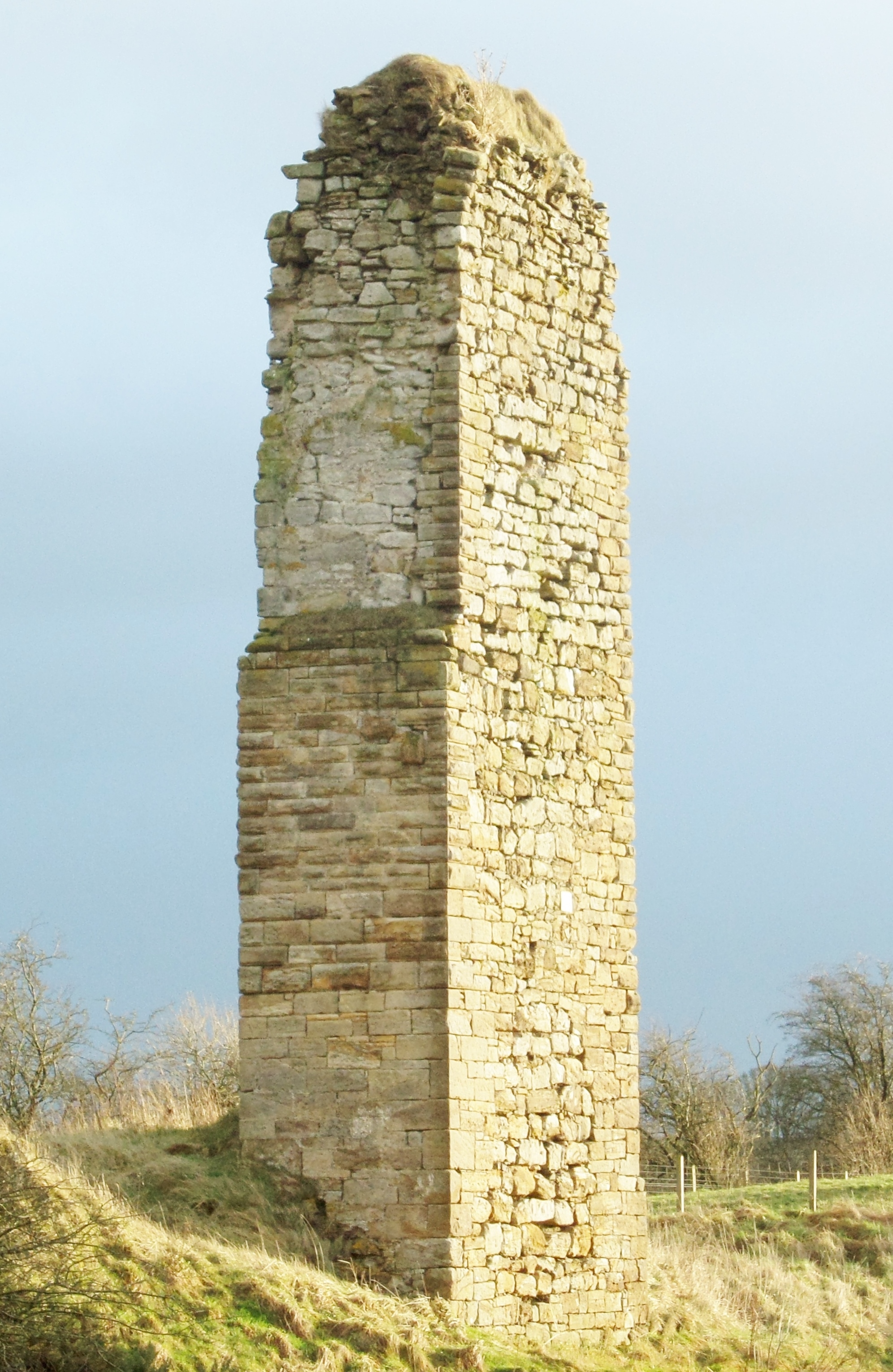
Corsehill Castle showing the two phases of consolidation stonework

The Blaeu map of 1654 based on Timothy Pont's earlier map gives 'Reuinskraig on the west side of the Clerkland Burn and 'Corshill' on the east side. Both are depicted the same without any clear suggestion of 'Reuinskraig' being a ruin. The 1779 estate map of Lainshaw shows Corsehill as a relatively small and apparently intact property on the east bank of the Corsehill/Clerkland Burn, reached by a road branching off at Cocklebie, running across the top of what is now the Cunninghame-Watt Park and turning uphill to reach the house. An avenue of trees ran down to the town, however this was interrupted by some of the Cocklebie lands which are not shown planted up. The ruined castle is shown as just the surviving part of the tower and it is otherwise unnamed. The whole area is called the Corsehill lands. Surprisingly only ten years after the estate map was surveyed Grose shows Corsehill House as an abandoned and much robbed ruin.

The 1828 map of Ayrshire by William Johnson only records Corsehill lying on the east side of the burn. The 1776 map by Taylor & Skinner shows a 'Corsehill' only as a dwelling house held by Sir William Cunynhame (sic).

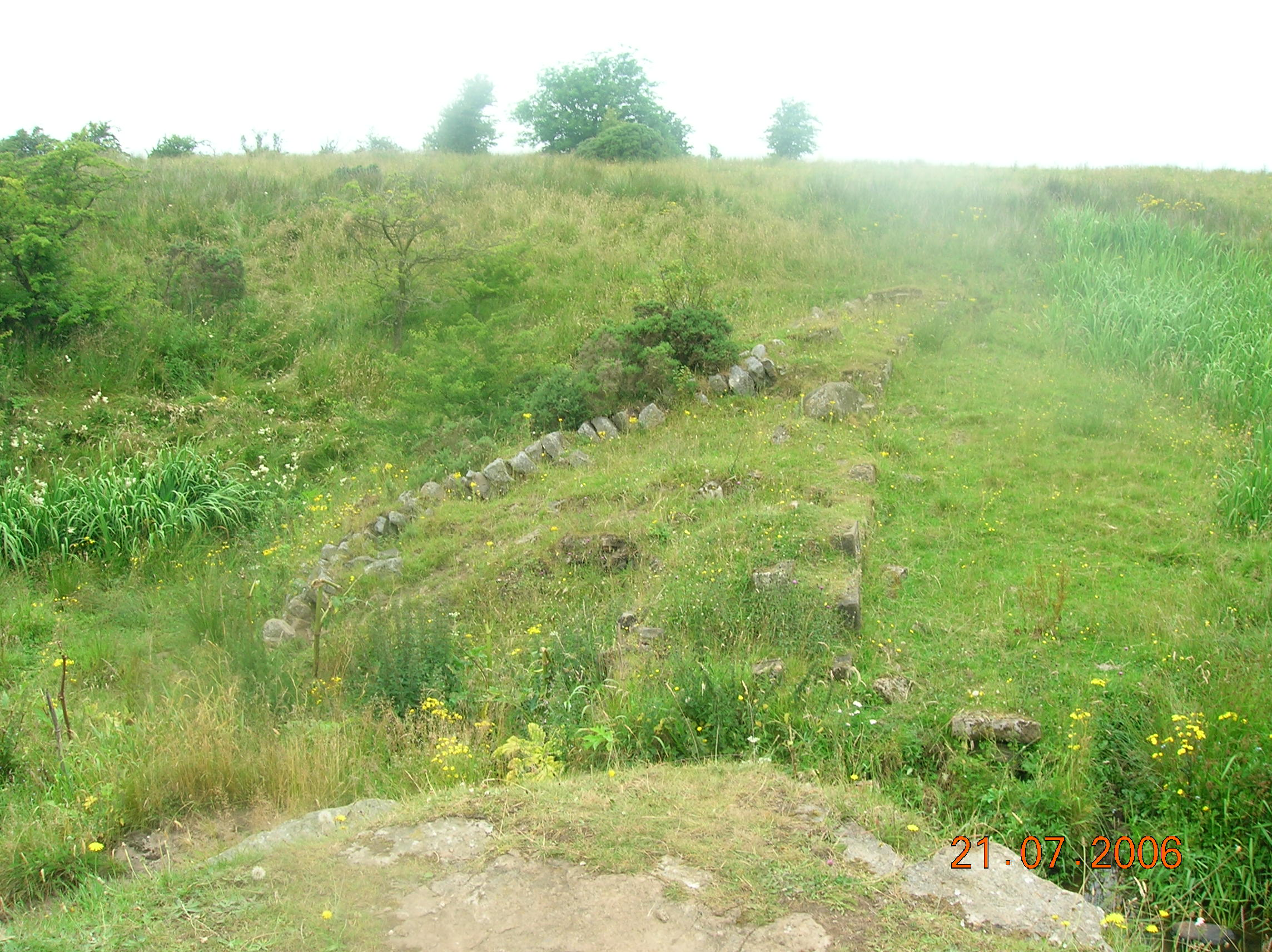
The remains of the dam on the Corsehill Burn.

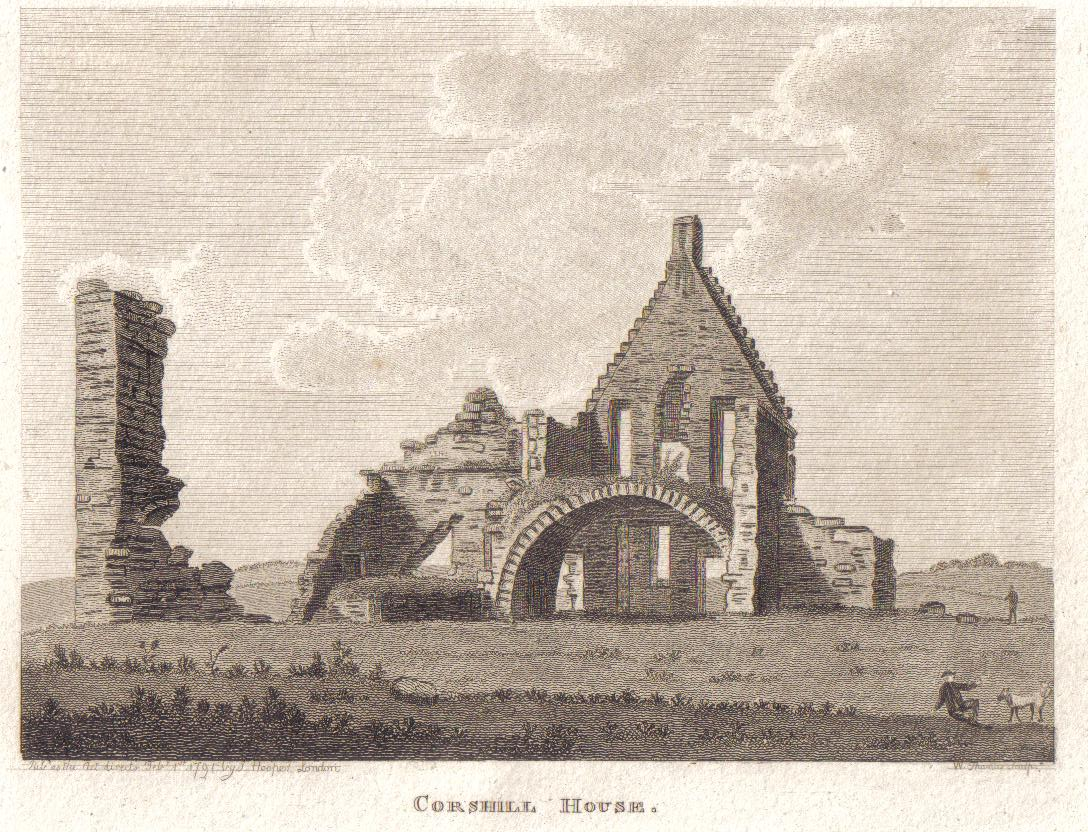
A 1789 View of Corsehill House, engraved in 1791 and published in 1797. Nothing remained of Corsehill House after circa 1800.

The old Corsehill Castle and Corsehill House (NS 416 415) were separate entities and a vague memory may persist of Templehouse and its fortalice at Darlington on the lands of Corsehill Farm, causing some extra confusion. (see below) Many references can be found to Corsehill/Corshill or even Crosshill in old records, none for 'Ravenscraig', but several for 'Reuincraig', although as stated, this is just a description of a ruin that was called 'Corsehill', 'ruined Corsehill'.

Archibald Adamson in his 'Rambles Round Kilmarnock' of 1875 makes no mention of the name Ravenscraig, calling the site he visited Corsehill. Aitken only marks Crosshill Castle in 1829 on the west side of the Corsehill Burn. The first OS maps show only the surviving castle's site.

To sum up, the map in Pont's 'Cuninghame' of 1604–1608 shows two buildings, "Reuincraige" and "Corshill", at approximately NS 417 467 and NS 422 465 respectively, and Dobie comments that the two have often been confused, but that "Reuincraig" stood on the west side of the Corsehill Burn and "Corsehill Mansion" on its east. "Reuincraig", he says, was ".. so modernised about 1840 that it was difficult to realise that it had been ruined in 1608", while the ruins of 'Corsehill House' were removed about the beginning of the 19th century and only foundations could be traced when he wrote. He also thought that "Reuincraig" (i.e. Ruin Craig) was not an original name. If Dobie is correct, the ruins published as "Corsehill Castle" on the OS 6", must be those of "Reuincraig", both because they are standing remains, and because they are on the west bank of the burn.

MacGibbon and Ross, describe Corsehill Castle at the end of the 19th century as a very ruinous mansion of a late date and apparently of an 'L-plan', belonging to the period 1542–1700 so they must be referring to Corsehill House. Grose, in 1797, published an illustration of 'Corshill House', but does not give its exact location. He mentions that "at a small distance from this ruin are some small remains of a more ancient building belonging to the same family", he is therefore referring to 'Old Corsehill Castle'.

General Roy's Military Survey of Scotland (1745–55) marks 'Ravenscraig' as 'Old Corsehill' and also marks the 'new' Corsehill on the other side of the burn, thereby apparently confirming that they both had the same name and one replaced the other, although only 'Old Corsehill' is still in any way visible, just some foundations of 'new' Corsehill being apparent in 2007, the rest of Corsehill House being removed in the 19th century.

Traces survive of a much silted up ditch that may be the remains of a track which led from the Stewarton to Dunlop road to the castle and then on to the cattle creep that runs under the railway line giving access to the east side where Corsehill House once stood.

The fine old sandstone bridge which carried the road up to Corsehill was demolished in the early 1990s. A local tradition was that the iron 'jougs' on it were for imprisoning witches, although it may be that these were linked to the Barony Court functions of the old Corsehill Barony, the records of which still survive and make reference to the stocks.

Adamson on his walking tour in 1875 records that Old Corsehill Castle was never very large and that the surviving portion showed signs of recent repair. A great treasure is said to lie buried beneath the founds in a dark chamber and that a local man had once starting digging in search of it when a voice arose from deep under the ground saying "Dig no more in ruined Ravenscraig".

A tunnel or Ley tunnel is said to run from near Old Corsehill Castle down to the Annick Water just up stream of Lainshaw Castle. The tunnel was supposedly crawled through by the grandfather of a local man. This tunnel may be related to the drainage of the nearby, flooded quarry, the Water Plantation area and other Lainshaw estate lands.

=== Templehouse fortalice ===
An area opposite the site of Templehouses was known as 'The Castle'. and this may reflect the existence of the castle or fortalice here (Hewitt 2006). An old road also crossed the river here and ran up to Robertland Castle and Nether Robertland (Lainshaw 1779). Steven states that William Dean held the feu for the area of Templehouse, now more commonly called 'Darlington'. The 1860 OS map does record the site of this Templehouse which may have had a small fortalice associated with it. Its precise site was at Darlington on the road to Kingsford before the East Burn. This area continued to be called Templehouses for many years after the buildings stones were removed by local people for building purposes.

=== The Baron-Court book ===
A remarkable and fortuitous survival is the 'Baron-Court book of the Baron-Court of Corshill', having been in the possession of Mr John Brown of Stewarton and published by the Ayr & Wigton Archaeological Association in 1884. The records start in 1666 and ends in 1719. In 1667 Hew Harper was fined and sentenced to be placed in the stocks at the 'Laird's pleasure'.

=== King's Kitchen ===
An old thatched cottage at the top end of Stewarton, on the road to Glasgow, had the name of "King's Kitchen Head", more recently called Braehead. It was nearly adjacent to the old baronial residence of Corsehill and was part of that barony. Further along the road is Kingsford and further along still is King's Well and the King's Stable. The story is told of a King who whilst on his progress of administering justice was given hospitality, for some long forgotten reason, at this cottage. The wife of the house begged the King for the life of her husband who was one of those to be tried by the King. The others were hanged, but the King dismissed the husband with the admonition "to be a better bairn.".

== Corsehill Castle and King Malcolm Canmore ==
This is a well known local story and one version given by Robert Cunningham in 1740 in his manuscript, entitled the Right Honorable the Earl of Glencairn's family, is that Macbeth murders his cousin, King Duncan I. The king's son, Malcolm Canmore (big head in Gaelic) tries to reach temporary safe refuge in his castle of Corsehill (also Crosshill). Macbeth’s men were almost upon Malcolm when he sees a peasant, Friskin (or Friskine), turning hay in a barn (or pasture) nearby. Friskin hides Malcolm who then escapes to England with Friskin as a retainer. King Harthacanute of England and Norway gave them protection. When Harthacanute died his successor King Edward the Confessor gave Malcolm an army which permitted him to conquer Scotland and kill King Macbeth. The grateful King Malcolm III (1031 to 1093) gave Friskine the thanedom or Baillery of Cunninghame and the family took this name, together with the motto of 'Over Fork Over' which they retain to this day. It is also said that the Cunninghams were 'Masters of the king's horses' and that they took their motto from this position in the 'punning way' which is typical of the armorial bearings and mottos of many an aristocratic family.

In another version of the story, it is stated by Frederick van Bassen who was a Norwegian historian, that the saviour of King Malcolm III was actually a Malcolm, son of Friskin, however in other respects the story is the same. This story does not fit with the historical record, however it is of ancient origin and a grain of truth must in some way relate it to real events. A Magbie or MacBeth Hill curiously or coincidentally exists above Stewarton near Old Coreshill Castle. Sir William Montgomery of Giffin acquired these lands, his father being Troilus Montgomery.

== Micro-history ==
The holder of the lands of Cocklebie had the 'right and privilege' of holding a weekly market and four yearly fairs.

Andrew Cunninghame was concerned in the murder of David Rizzio.

Sir A. Cunningham of Corsehill attended the famous 1839 Eglinton Tournament in what is now Eglinton Country Park and he was allotted a seat in the Grand Stand.

Robertson in 1820 refers to Macbeth Hill (Magbie) as being part of the Corsehill lands. Troilus Montgomery became Laird of MacBeth-hill or Magbie hill in Peeblesshire.

Timothy Pont in 1604–1608 records that so thickly was the district about Stewarton and along the banks of the Irvine populated for a space of three or four miles (6 km) "that well travelled men in divers parts of Europe (affirm) that they have seen walled cities not so well or near planted with houses so near each other as they are here, wherethrough it is so populous that, at the ringing of a bell in the night for a few hours, there have seen convene 3000 able men, well-horsed and armed."

In the 1600s Stuartoune had fairs on the first Thursday of January, the first Monday of May, and the last Wednesday of October. A weekly market on Thursdays is recorded as being not well attended.

In 1820 only six people were qualified to vote as freeholders in Stewarton Parish, being proprietors of Robertland (Hunter Blair), Kirkhill (Col. J. S. Barns), Kennox (McAlester), Lainshaw (Cunninghame), Lochridge (Stewart) and Corsehill (Montgomery-Cunninghame).

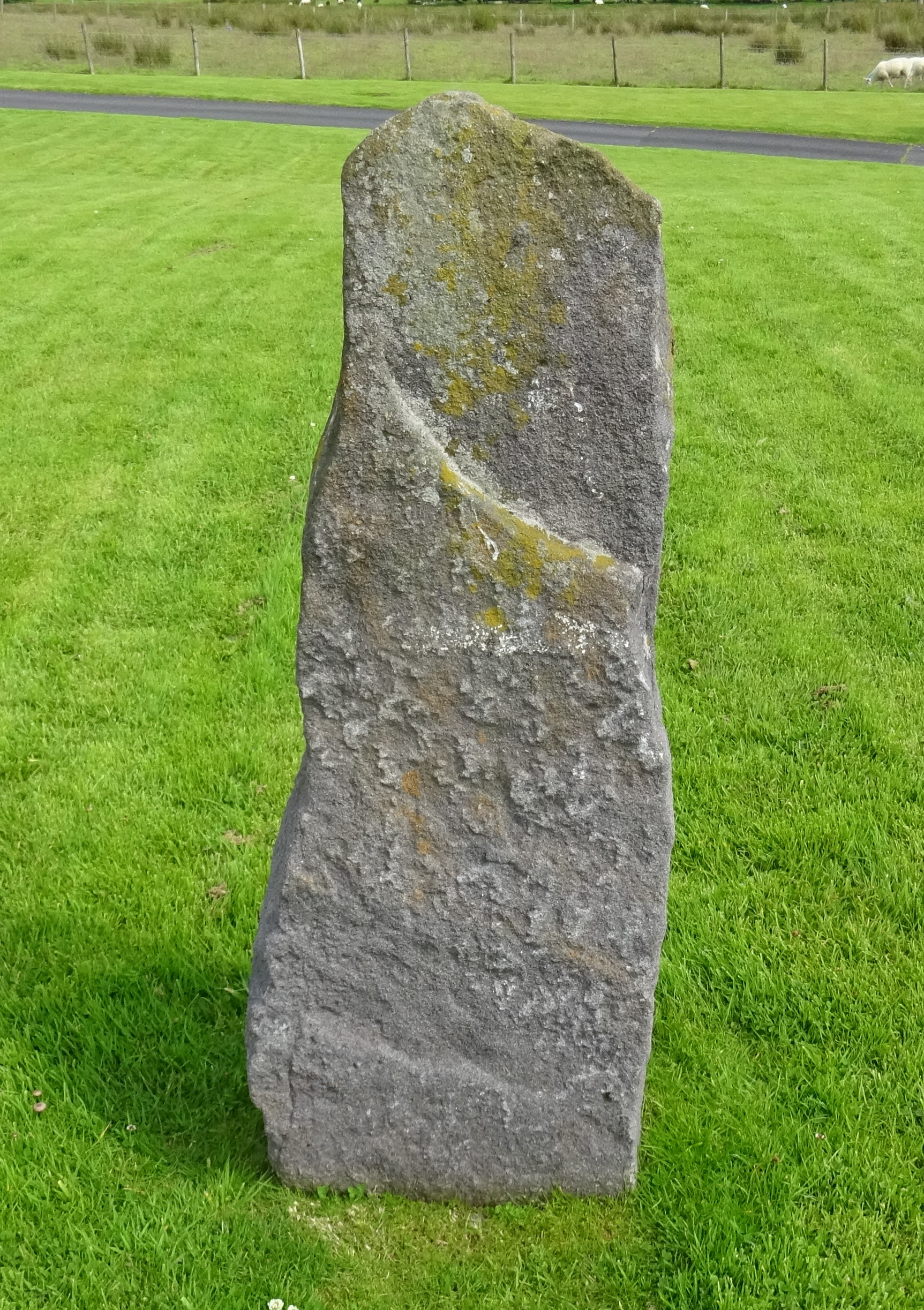
The Draffen Stone outside Draffen House (previously Upper Lochridge in Stewarton)

The Draffen Stone used to be in a field near the house of the same name. Due to a housing development it has been moved to a site in front of Draffen House. It is not known whether this stone is merely a 'rubbing stone' for cattle or a menhir. It is not recorded by Historic Scotland.

The Lairds of Corsehill were the Deacons Heritable of the Bonnet Court of Corsehill which regulated the activities of the Stewarton bonnet makers.

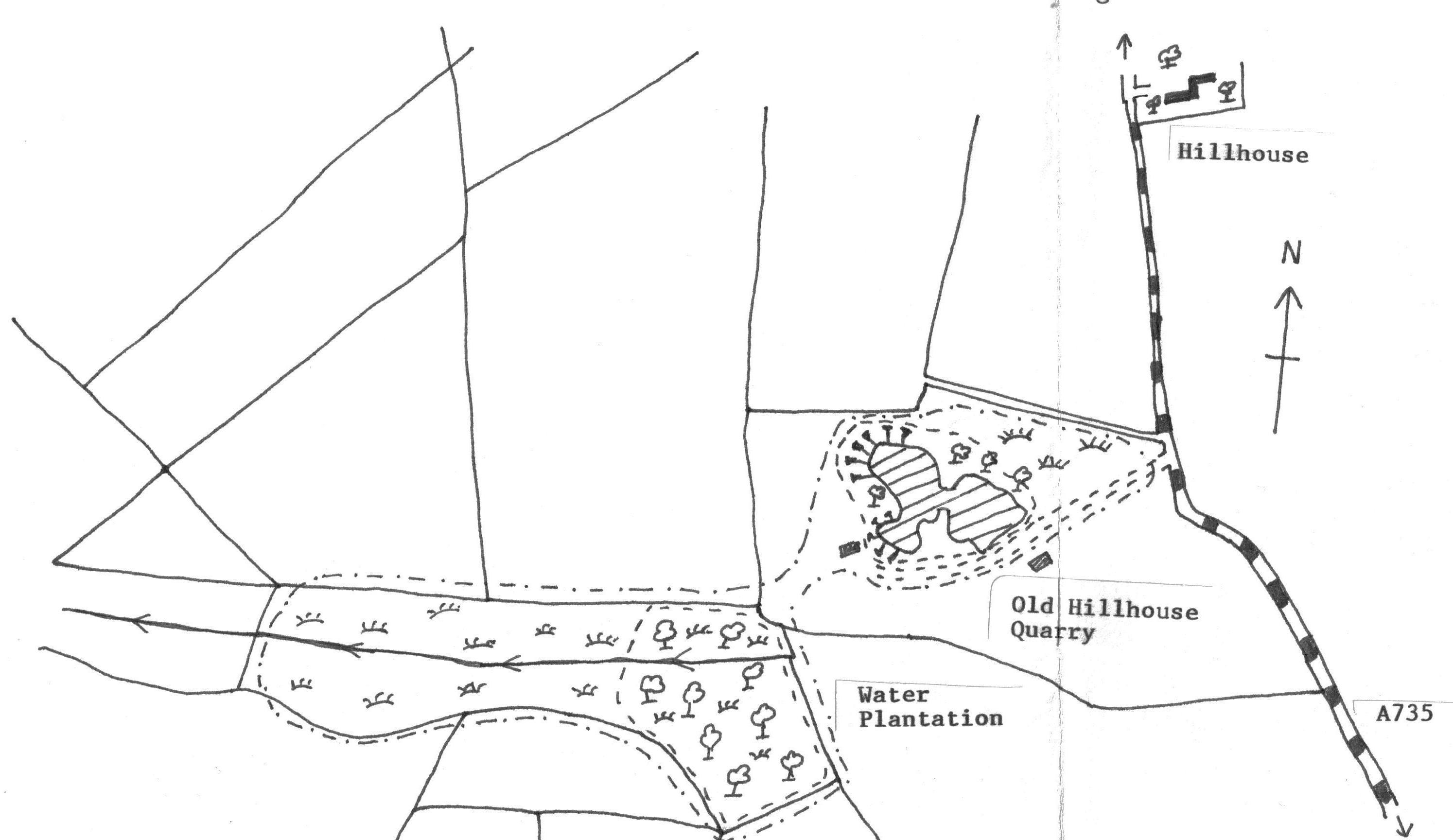
Old Hillhouse quarry and the Water plantation.

The first Corsehill Queen is jocularly said to be King Malcolm III second wife, Queen Margaret, niece of Edward the Confessor of England. This Malcolm III, also known as Malcolm Canmore, was also Lord of Corsehill. She was canonised and St. Margaret's Chapel is the oldest surviving building at Edinburgh Castle, Highlanders however called her the 'Accursed Margaret.'

In 1797 Magbie Hill above Stewarton has a field called 'Stone Field' which may record a standing stone now long destroyed or possibly moved as the nearby farm has two large boulders in front of it. Coal pits are marked in the vicinity of Magbie (MacBeth) Hill, possibly explaining the name, as 'mag' was a term used for poor quality coal. The nearby 'Water Plantation' was known as 'Magbie-hill Plantation'.

Dunlop and Stewarton both stand on the old turnpike, completed from Glasgow by Lugton, to Kilmarnock, Irvine and Ayr in 1820 at the cost of £18,000.

== See also ==
- Dunlop, East Ayrshire
- Cunninghamhead
- Chapeltoun
- Lambroughton
- John Montgomery-Cuninghame of Corsehill
- Stones of Scotland
- House of Stuart
- Cunninghamhead, Perceton and Annick Lodge
- Thorntoun Estate
- Kilmaurs
- Barbara Gilmour
- Kirkwood Estate, East Ayrshire
- Lands of Blacklaw
