= Lands of Cocklebie =

Coordinates: 55.683°N 4.518°W

- Location within East Ayrshire
- Council area: East Ayrshire
- Lieutenancy area: Ayrshire
- Country: Scotland
- Sovereign state: United Kingdom
- Post town: Kilmarnock
- Police: Scotland
- Fire: Scottish
- Ambulance: Scottish

The Lands of Cocklebie or Cocklebee formed an estate possessing a common border with the estates of Lainshaw, the Corsehill, and the town of Stewarton, East Ayrshire, Parish of Stewarton, Scotland.

== History ==
=== The house and estate ===
The 40 shilling lands of Cocklebie with "manour place, towers, biggings, and yards, in the Barony of Stewarton, Bailiary of Cunninghame, with teinds, parsonage, and vicarage of Cocklebie." Cocklebie Meadow recorded. The farm of Cocklebie was part of the Lainshaw Estate in 1873. Cocklebierigg and Cocklebie croft are also recorded. The Farm Horse Tax records for 1797 to 1798 give Alexander Bone as the farmer at Cocklebie with two horses. In the 1645 to 1831 Land Tax Rolls records Cocklebie, Backmure, & Goosehills are valued at £177.1.8 and the proprietor is given as the Earl of Kilmarnock. A later valuation gives David Cuninghame Esq as the proprietor of Cocklebie Bakemuir and Goosehills with a valuation of £117.1.8. In 1857 to 1858 Cocklebee was recorded as a small dairy farm with a freestone quarry nearby.

=== Lairds ===
In 1476 David Lindsay and his wife, former wife of Jenkin Stewart, were in dispute with John Ross of Montgreenan over the tack of three merks worth of the lands of Cockilbie.

In 1608 Robert Montgomerie of Kirklands held the sasine of the lands of Cockilbie. In 1630 John Montgomerie of Cockilbie was nominated by the Lord Commissioners as a sub-commissioner at the Presbytery of Irvine for valuing the teinds (tithes) of Scotland in that area.

In 1638, John Montgomerie of Cockilbie (sic) died, leaving a wife, Jeanne Forrester and children John, Agnes, Barabara, Margaret, and Catherine. He may have held Broadstone Castle near Beith and held lands in Ireland. The will was signed at Cockilbee in 1636.

The Hon Alexander Cunningham of Corsehill (d. May 1646), married Marion Porterfield, the daughter of William Porterfield of that Ilk and Duchal, and had a child, Sir Alexander Cunningham of Corsehill. Alexander married Mary Stewart, daughter of John Stewart of Blackhall, and had two children, the second of whom was known as Cuthbert Cunningham of Cockilbie.

Neil Montgomerie married the heiress of Lord Lyle and had a son, Neil, who died before 1621. Their son, Neil, had married Elizabeth, daughter of John Cunningham and had four children, Neil of Lainshaw, William of Bridgend, James of Dunlop, and John of Cockilbie. Neil and his son John sold their estates in 1654 to John of Cockilbie.

In 1666 Cuthbert Cunynghame of Cocklbee (sic) disponed the lands of Cocklbee and Kirktowne to Alexander Cunynghame younger of Corshill, giving up the rental of the lands that was six pounds Scots and two hens as well as a days service at the harvest, the latter service was disputed in the barony court.

Alexander Dickie of Cocklbee (sic) was the procurator fiscal to the Corsehill Baron-Court in 1668.

The holder of the lands of Cockilbie had the 'right and privilege' of holding a weekly market and four yearly fairs in 1707.

== Cartographic evidence ==
The 1779 Lainshaw and Kirkwood Estate map shows East (with parks and yards) and West Cockilbie, amounting to 7 Acres for East and 77 for West. An un-named group of three houses are shown on the Dunlop road with the yard and a well opposite. Roy's map shows 'Cocklebay' as the placename spelling.

John Thomson's map of 1832 records the site as 'Cockle'.

The 1856 25" mile OS map shows a 'Cocklebee' with a sandstone quarry of that name nearby.

The location of the Cocklebie Estate, East Ayrshire

== Micro-history ==
The word 'cockle' in Scots refers to a fir cone and is a common name for various weeds. The term 'bie' means a settlement as in Whitby.

Cocklebie Road and Cockilbee View in Stewarton commemorate the location of the old farm and manor house.

Alexander Dickie and John Wyllie are recorded as the tenants of Cocklebee (sic) in 1666.

In 1668 the baron-court of Corshill determined that all the graine groundable from the lands of Cocklbee and Kirktowne (sic) should be ground at Clerkland Mill.

In 1671 James Limont pursued Robert Wilson of Cockilbie at the barony court for withholding 8 merks of payment to Issobel Lymont (sic).

In 1673 the baillie of the barony court instructed William Smith of Cockilbie to pay Robert Smith of Kirkton the sum of six pounds and five shillings.

In 1679 Alexander Dickie of Cocklebee pursued John Pinkerton in Goosehills for corn that had been eaten by his animals and that had not been paid for.

In 1683 Allan Greer, a skinner from Kilmarnock, pursued Alexander Dickie for £17 Scots.

In 1687 John Wyllie of Cocklbee promised to ensure that his brother-german, Andrew Wyllie, would act in a christian and peaceful fashion.

== See also ==
- Lands of Blacklaw
- Lainshaw
- Stewarton
- Barony and Castle of Corsehill
- Kennox House
