= Kingsford (name) =

Kingsford is both a surname and a given name. Notable people with the name include:

== Surname ==
- Anna Kingsford (1846-1888), advocate of women's rights and vegetarianism
- Charles Lethbridge Kingsford (1862-1926), English historian and topographer
- Florence Kingsford (1871-1949), English illustrator better known as Florence Kingsford Cockerell
- Philip Kingsford (1891-?), athlete
- Richard Ash Kingsford, Australian politician
- Robert Kingsford (1849-1895), footballer
- Walter Kingsford (1882-1958), actor
- William Kingsford (1819-1898), historian

== Given name ==
- Kingsford Dibela (1932–2002), former Governor-General of Papua New Guinea
- Sir Charles Kingsford Smith (1897-1935), Australian aviator
