= Kingsford, East Ayrshire =

Coordinates: 55.701974°N 4.477776°W

Kingsford
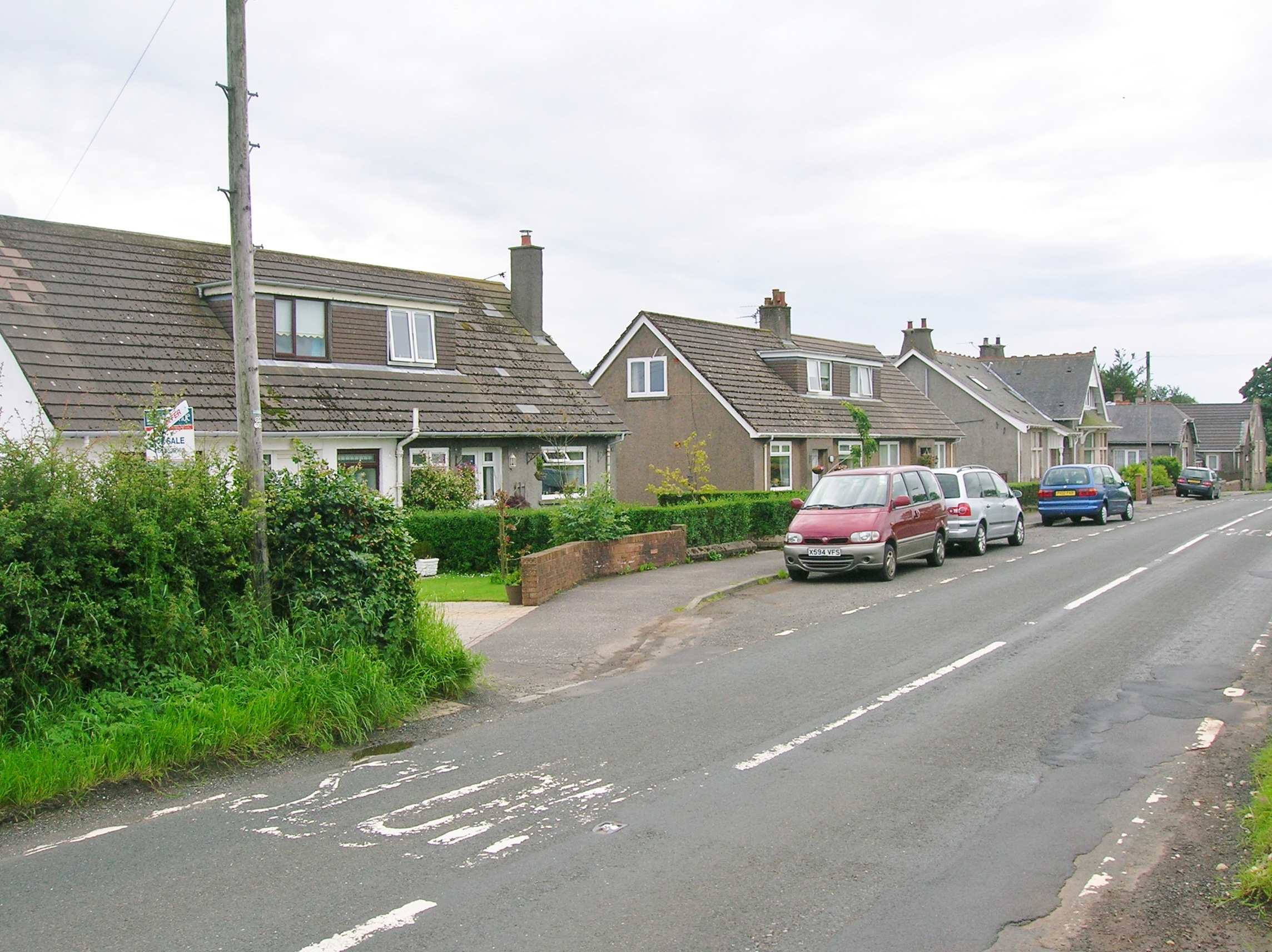
- The Annick Cottages in Kingsford

- Location within East Ayrshire
- OS grid reference: NS 44390 48175
- Council area: East Ayrshire
- Lieutenancy area: Ayrshire and Arran
- Country: Scotland
- Sovereign state: United Kingdom
- Police: Scotland
- Fire: Scottish
- Ambulance: Scottish

Kingsford is a hamlet or clachan in Strathannick, East Ayrshire, parish of Stewarton, Scotland. The habitation is situated on the B769, two miles north of Stewarton and fourteen miles from Glasgow.

== History ==
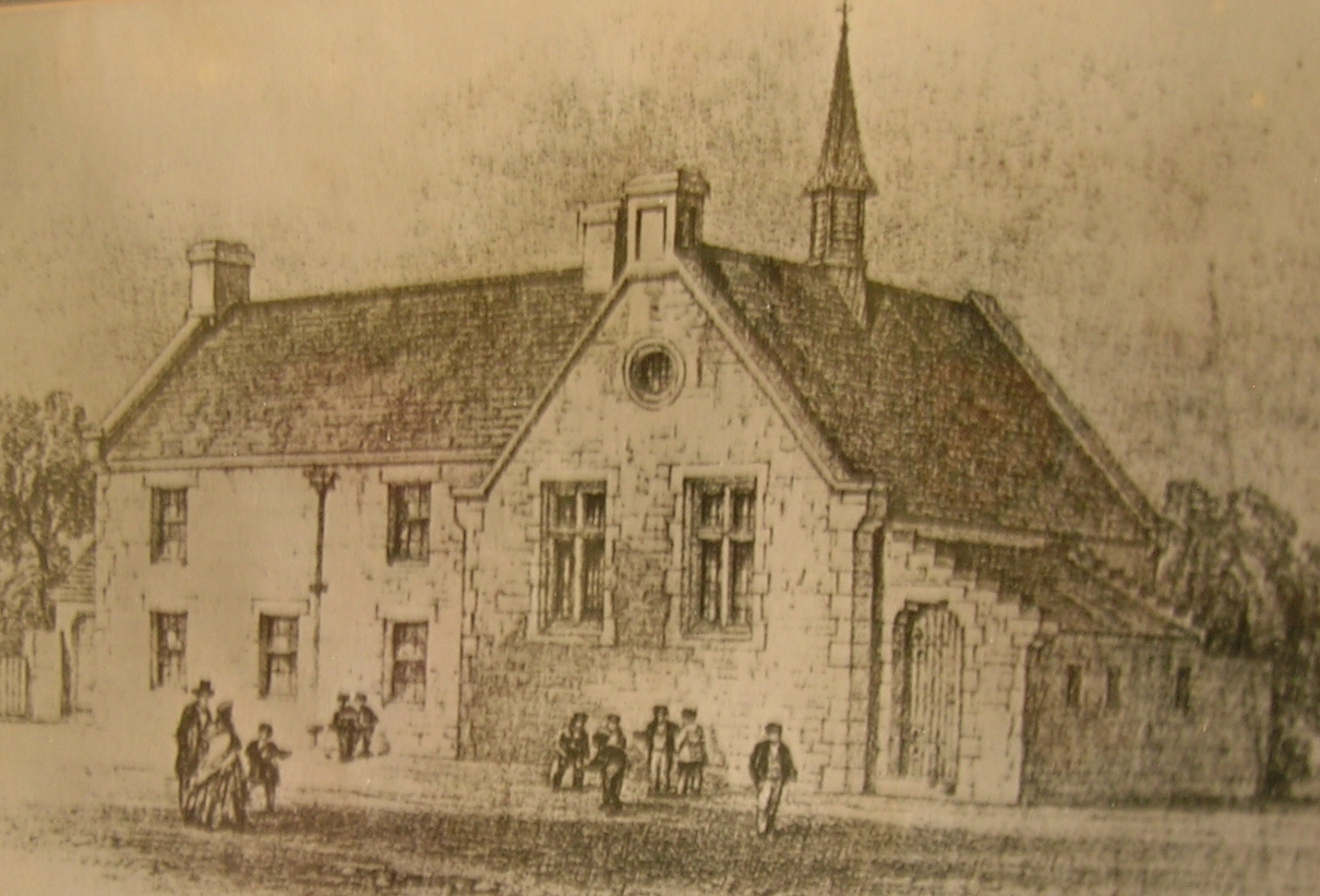
The old school that was destroyed by fire.

The Annick Cottages, typical Ayrshire agricultural labourers accommodation, built circa 1967, are named after the nearby Annick Water. These more modern semi-detached buildings are located next to the old school that was designed by Thomas Leverton Donaldson (1795–1885), born at the nearby Williamshaw House and who later became professor of architecture at London University. West Spittal Farm lies to the north and Broom Farm to the south. Robertland House lies nearby and once owned the farms of Broom, West and East Spittal.

Spittal refers to lands, the revenues of which supported a medieval hospital run by the church, or which may have been the site of such a hospital, however no local knowledge about this has been recorded. The older cottages at Kingsford bear the date 1837. It is worth noting that a monastic Grange, probably belonging to Kilwinning Abbey existed at nearby Craignaught before the Reformation as suggested by the numerous placenames evidence, with Grangehill, Townhead of Grange, Mid Grange, South Grange, etc. A glebe field was also located here.

=== Kingsford School ===
The Kingsland Burn runs through the site. A small school existed here and has now been converted into a private dwelling. The previous school was destroyed by fire in the early 20th century. The architects Andrew and Newlands designed the changes to this circa 1875 school in 1904. The same company also worked on the harled and single storeyed school teacher's house. The school gable has a set of quirky grotesques built into it of unknown age; they may represent the proverb "see no evil, hear no evil, speak no evil".

=== King's Kitchen, Kingsford, Kingsland, King's Well and King's Stables ===
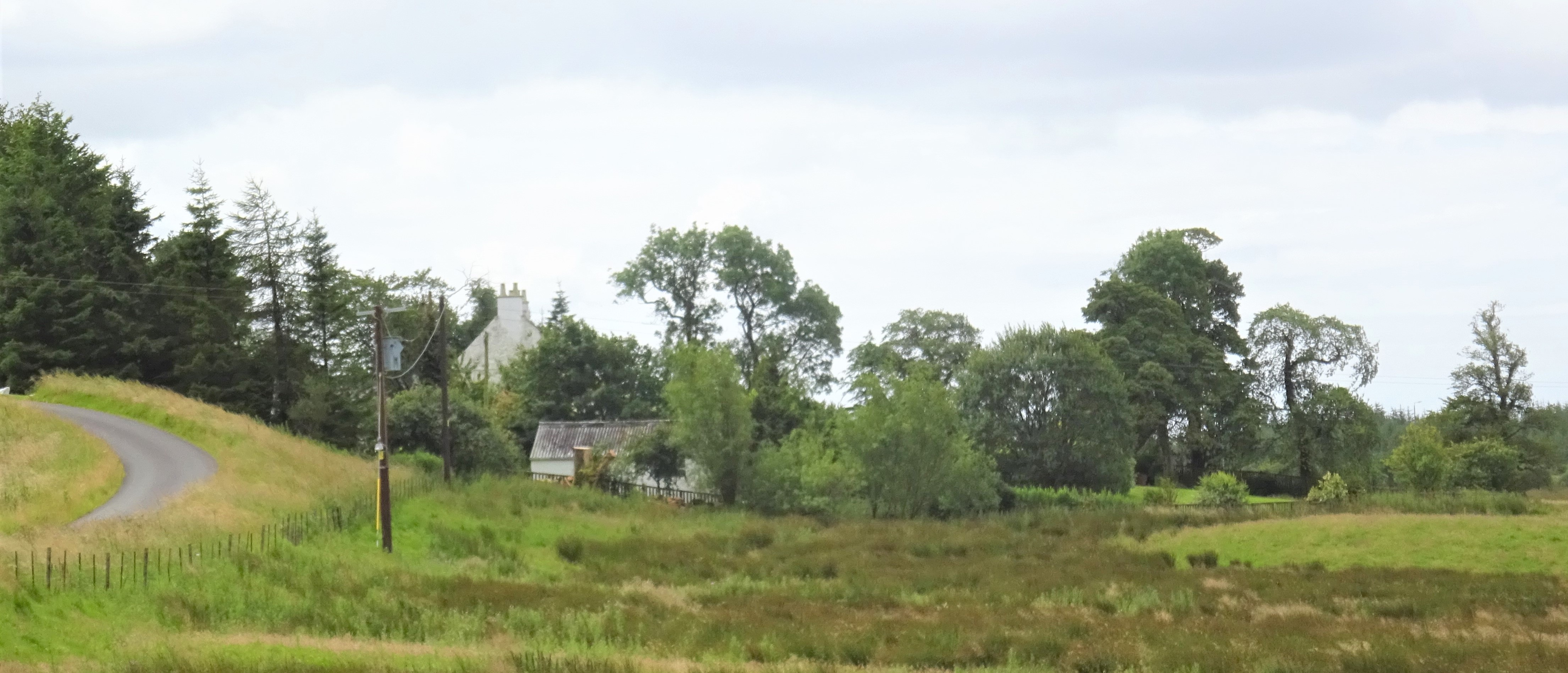
King's Well Inn site, Eaglesham Moor.

An old thatched cottage at the top end of Stewarton, on the B769 to Glasgow, had the name of "King's Kitchenhead", more recently called Braehead. The story is told of a King, possibly James V who whilst on his progress of administering justice was given hospitality, for some long forgotten reason, at this cottage. The wife of the house begged the King for the life of her husband who was one of those to be tried by the King. The others were hanged, but the King dismissed the husband with the admonition "to be a better bairn.". A version of the legend adds the detail that eighteen men were in the dungeon at Polkelly Castle and the king, being weary after crossing Fenwick Moor, was given hospitality at a wayside cottage.

Kingsford, Kingsland Burn, King's well and King's Stable are said to have been on the route of the monarch. King's well is linked to James V or James VI through the legend that he stopped to water his horse who then became firmly stuck in the bog, thus the ironic term King's Stable!

This strange story may in some way link to James V's nickname of "King of the Commons" as it is said that he sometimes travelled around Scotland disguised as a common man, describing himself as the "Gudeman of Ballengeich."

=== Cartographic evidence ===
In 1747 the clachan of Kingsford is indicated on Roy's map, on the West Spittal Farm side of the road. Johnson's map of 1828 marks Kingsford as a building at Spittal Farm road end.

Broom Farm is shown as having been a mill in 1858 with a dam on the Kingsland Burn, millpond and lade running to the mill. The school was present and two dwellings before the lane to Broom Mill. A row of houses, no longer extant, were located opposite the school. By 1910 a teacher's house has been built next to the school and the row opposite has been demolished.

== Images ==
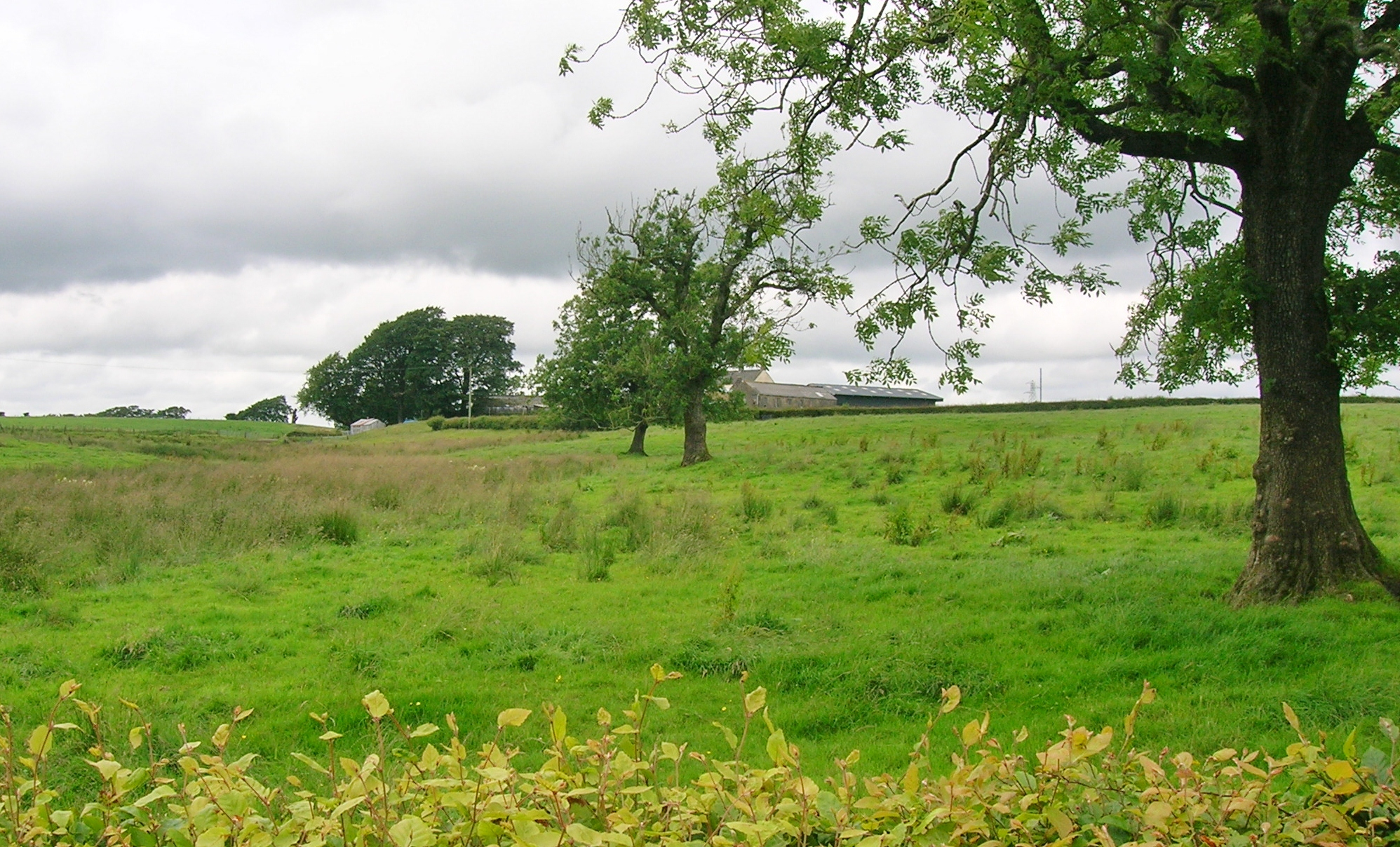
Site of the old row. West Spittal Farm in the background.

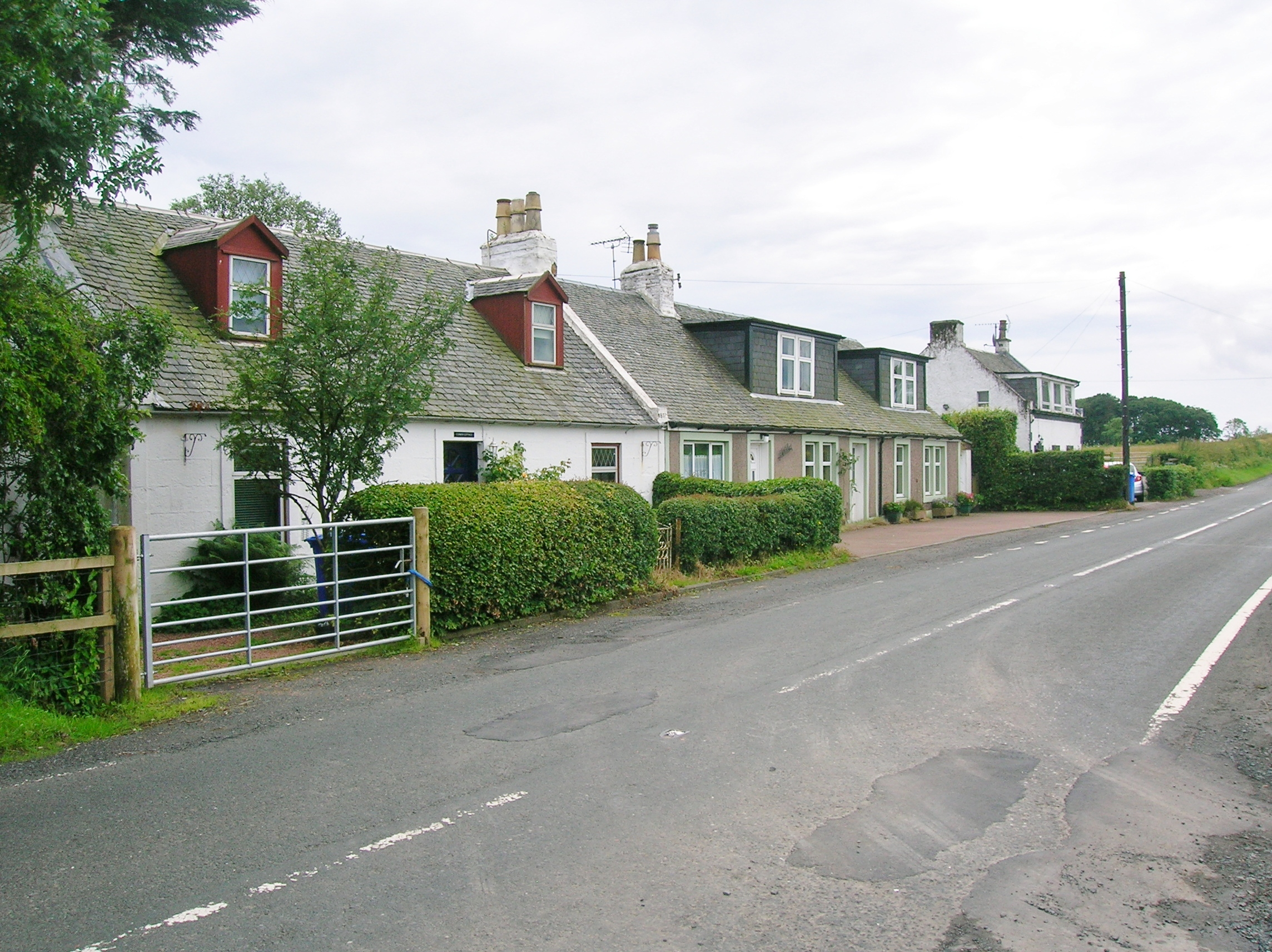
The old cottages.

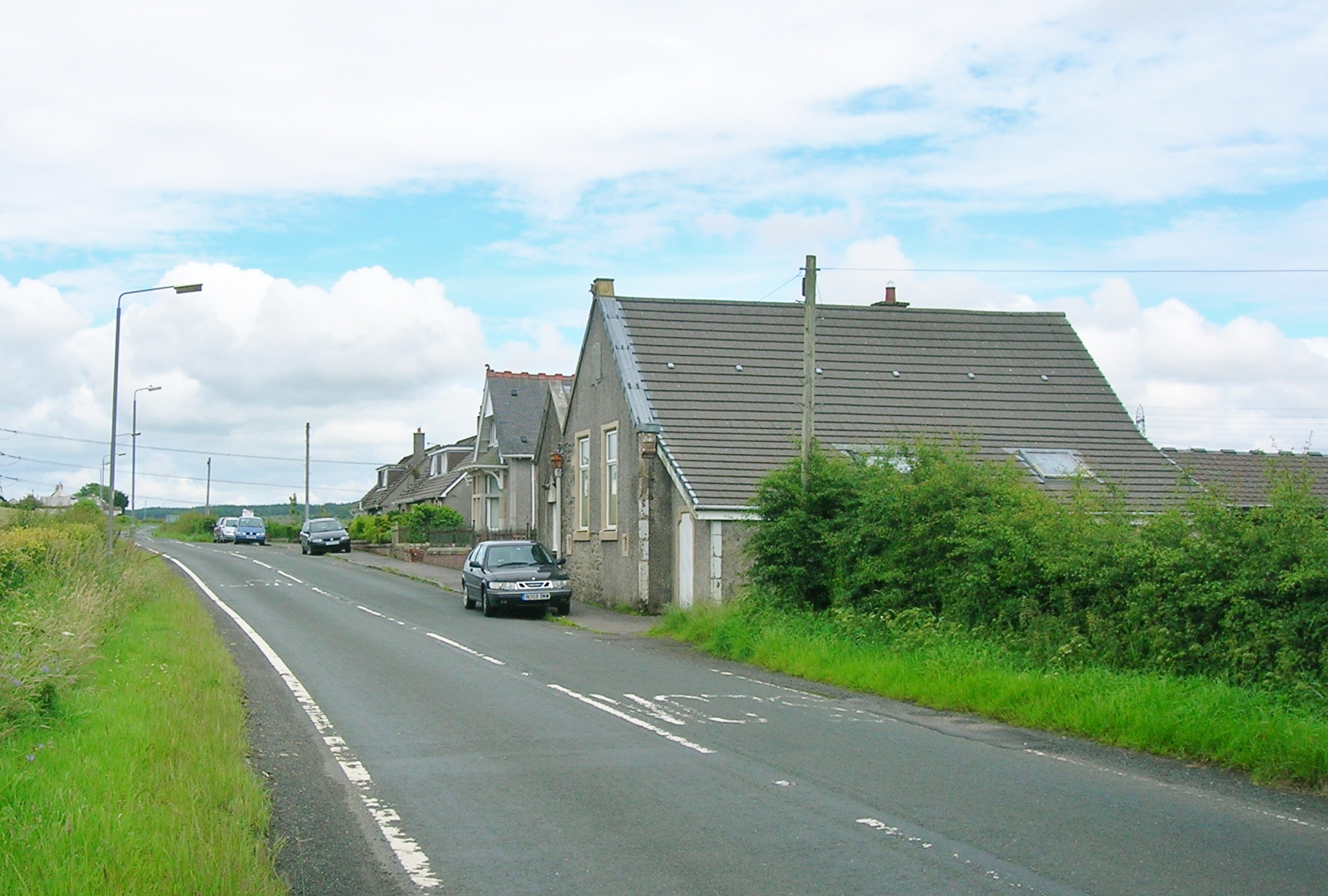
The old schoolhouse and Annick Cottages.

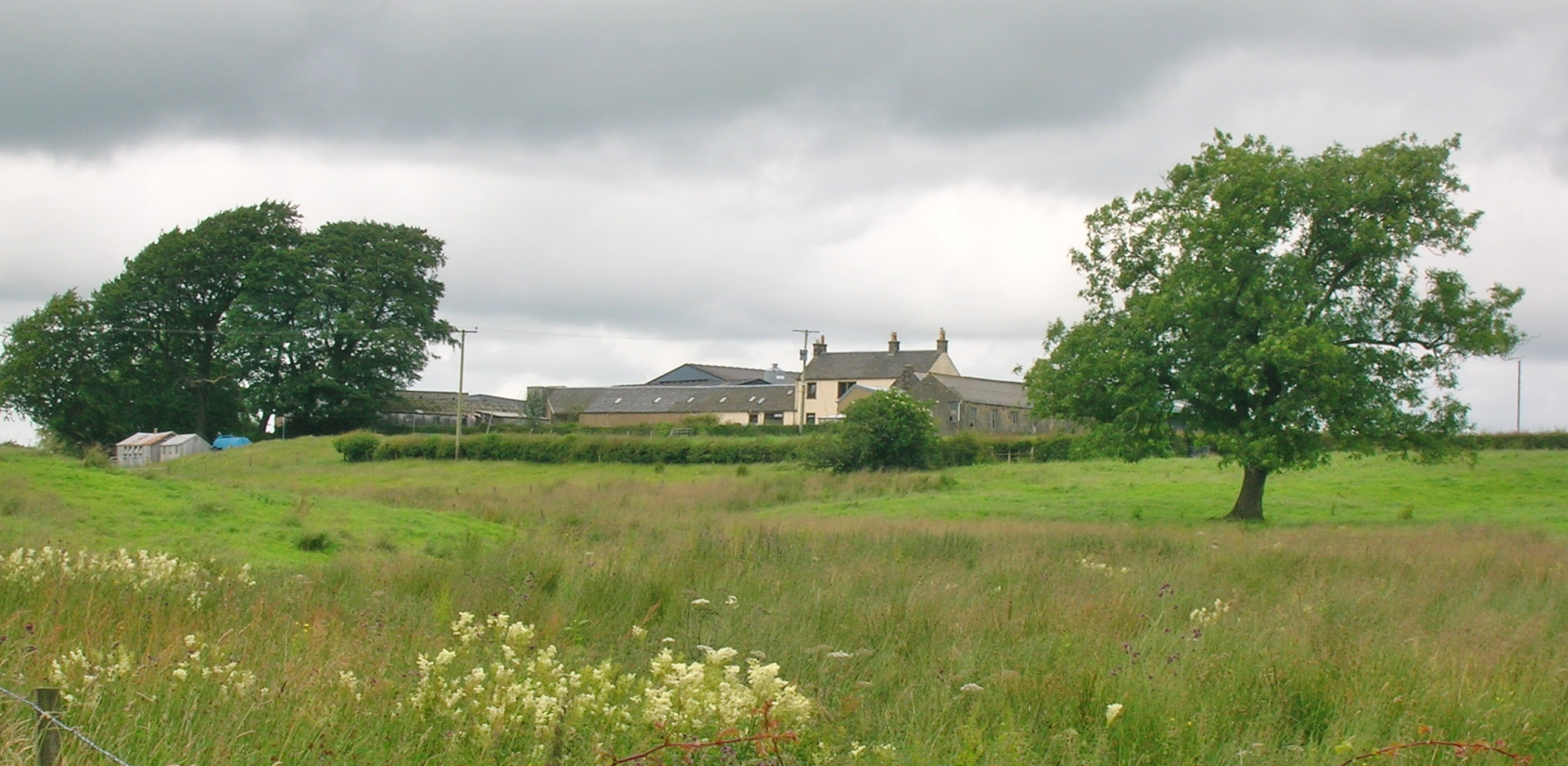
West Spittal Farm and the Kingsland Burn.

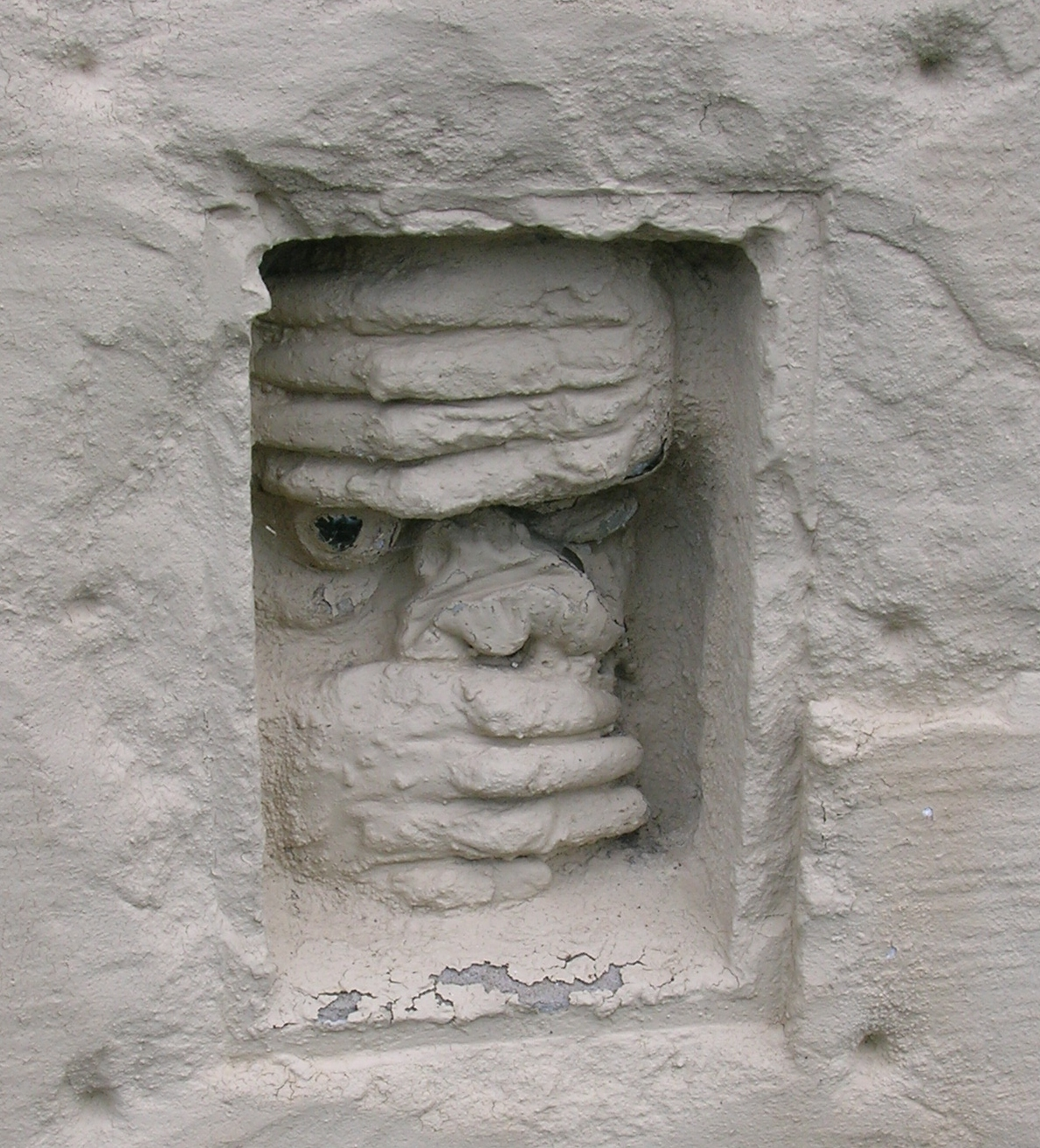
A grotesque at the old school.

== Micro-history ==
Surprisingly a summer house is shown in 1856, located in an enclosure to the east of the school.

== See also ==
- Stewarton
- Castle and Barony of Robertland
- Lands of Blacklaw
