= Lands of Lainshaw =

Lands in Scotland

Lainshaw House
- Stewarton, East Ayrshire, Scotland; GB grid reference NS255564, 620506
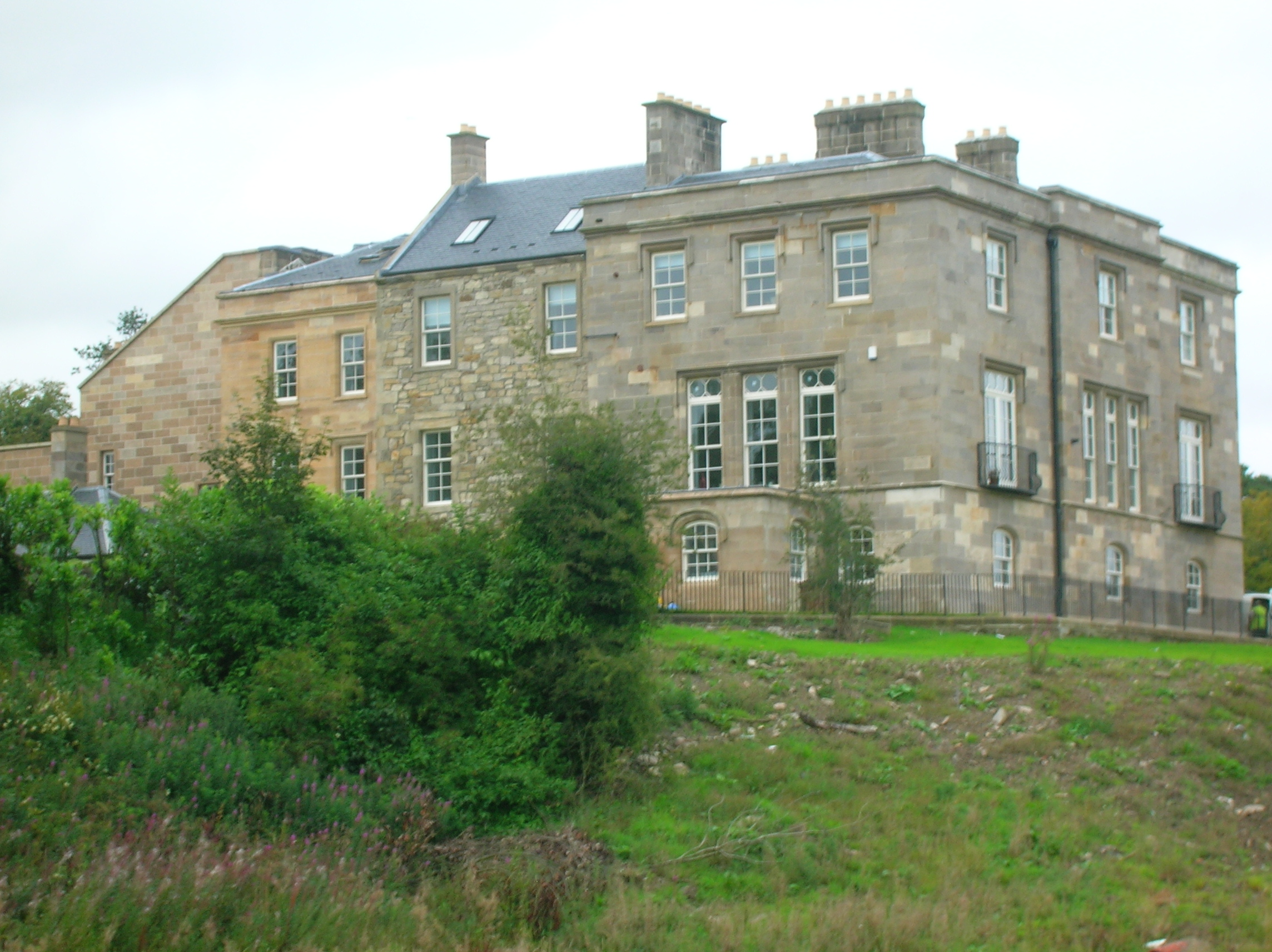
- The restored Lainshaw House in 2007, showing the various construction phases.

Site information
- Owner: Private
- Open to the public: No
- Condition: Flats

Location
- Shown within Scotland
- Location within Scotland
- Coordinates: 55.674929°N 4.529863°W

Site history
- Built: Circa 1779
- Built by: Cunninghame
- Materials: Stone

The Lands of Lainshaw lie in Strathannick and were part of the Lordship of Stewarton, in East Ayrshire, Scotland. Lainshaw House is a category B listed mansion, lying in a prominent position above the Annick Water and its holm in the Parish of Stewarton, Scotland. Part of the much older Lainshaw Castle is contained within the several later building phases of the present day Lainshaw House. The names 'Langshaw' or 'Langschaw' were used in historic times. Law Mount near the High and Laigh Castleton farms has been suggested as the site of the original castle, granted in the 12th century to Godfrey de Ross by Hugo de Morville.

== The Lands of Lainshaw ==
=== The lairds ===
Etymology
The name Lainshaw was derived from the Scots words Lang and Shaw. The meaning is a long strip of woodland rather than a large wood or forest.

As the original seat of the Stuarts or Stewarts it was considered of much value and was bestowed by the Scottish Kings only as a special mark of favour. Mary Queen of Scots changed the spelling to 'Stuart' during her time in France to ensure that the French pronounced the name correctly. James, High Steward of Scotland, inherited Stewarton in 1283. Robert III granted it to Archibald the Grim, Earl of Douglas then took it back to bestow as a dowry on Elizabeth, the Earl's daughter, when she married John Stewart, Earl of Buchan. The lands reverted to the crown many times. Queen Mary presented the lands to Mary Livingstone, one of the famous 'four Marys', upon her marriage to John Sempill, son of Lord Sempill in 1565. John Knox referred to them as "John the Dancer and Marie the Lusty". The Montgomeries obtained the lands shortly after.

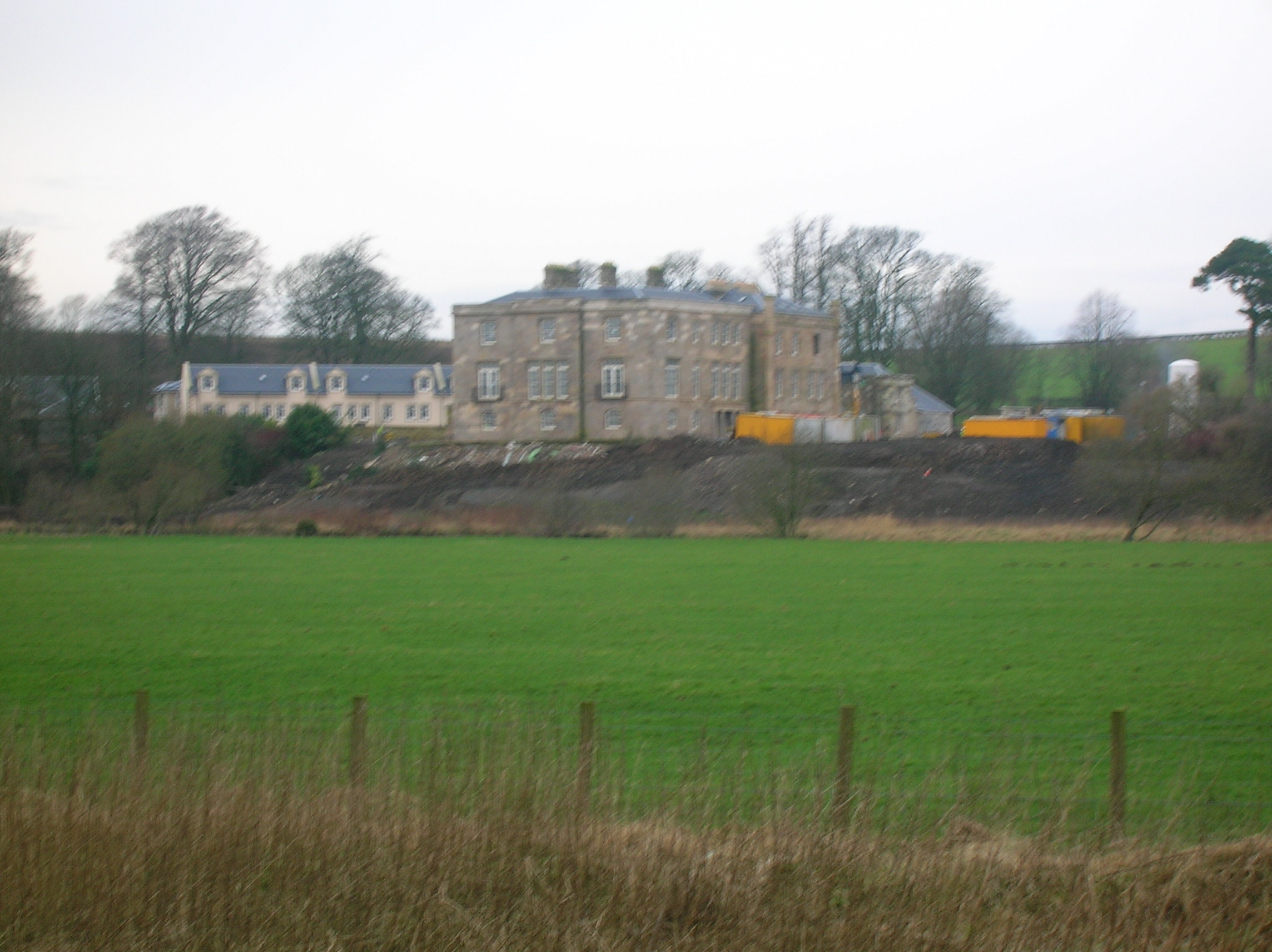
A view of the renovated Lainshaw House in 2007 from the Cunninghamhead road

One of the earliest references to Lainshaw is the grant of land to Alexander Home of Holme by King James II in 1450. Castleton, Gallowberry, Whitelee, Crennachbrare, Robertland and Magbiehill (Magby Hill in 1775) were also included in the grant. Thomas Home inherited, but he died without issue and it passed to the Eglinton family, namely Sir Neil or Nigel Montgomerie of Langshaw who was the third son of Hugh Montgomerie, 1st Earl of Eglinton. He was killed at Irvine in 1547 through the feud with the Mowats of Busbie and Lord Boyd. His son, John, married Margaret, daughter of Lord Boyd. John Montgomerie died without issue and his brother Neil became the third laird.

Neil Montgomerie married the heiress of Lord Lyle and had a son, Neil, who died before 1621. The son, Neil, had married Elizabeth, daughter of John Cunningham and had four children, Neil of Lainshaw, William of Bridgend, James of Dunlop, and John of Cockilbie. Neil and his son John sold their estates in 1654 to John of Cockilbie.

In 1745 the "Laird of Langshaw" died suddenly from drinking bad wine. When the 9th Laird, James, died in 1767 his eldest sister, Elizabeth inherited. James daughter Margaret Montgomerie would marry the diarist James Boswell. Elizabeth had married Alexander Montgomerie-Cuninghame of Kirktonholme, son of Sir David Cuninghame of Corsehill. Her second husband was J. Beaumont Esq.

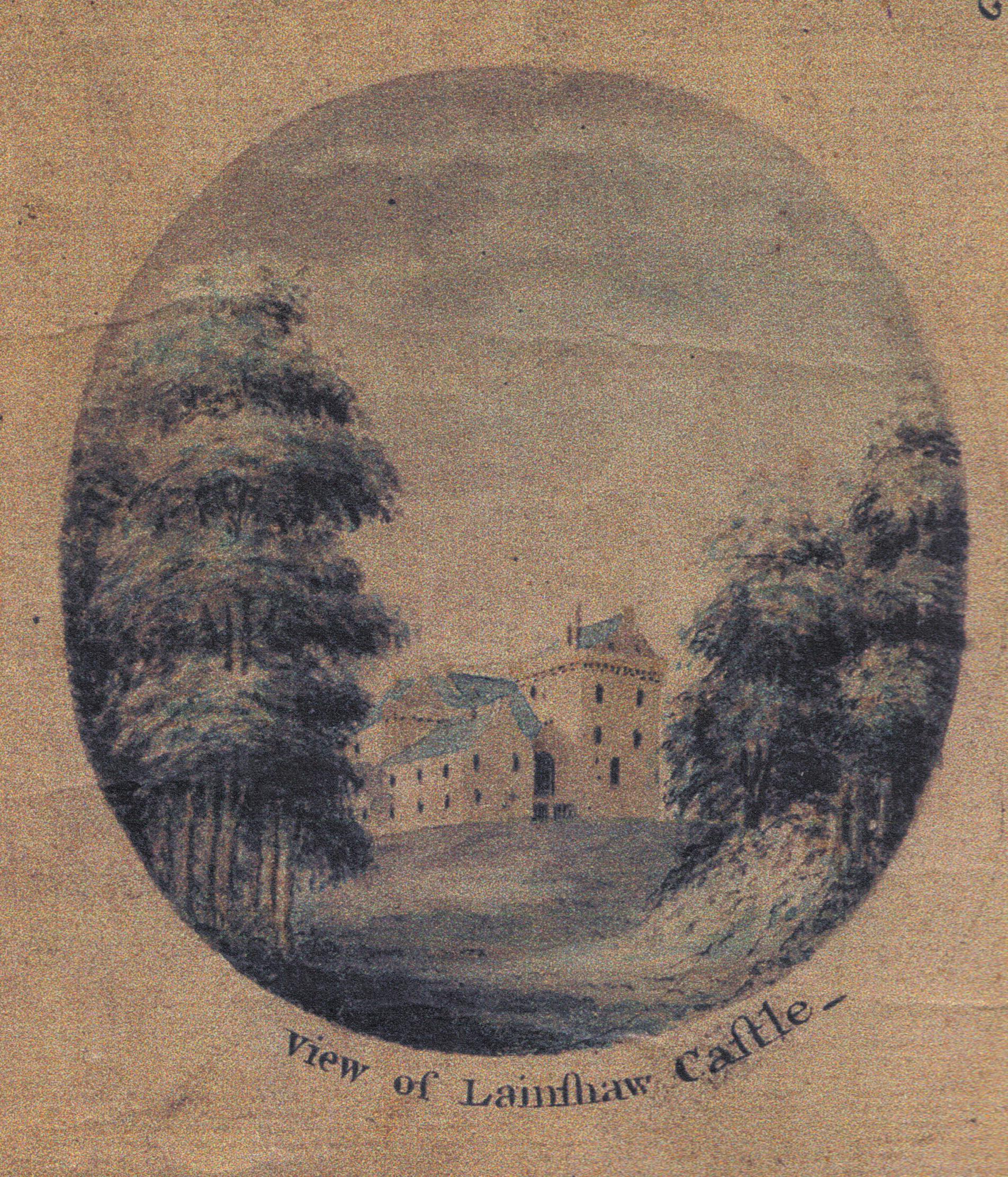
Lainshaw Castle in 1779.

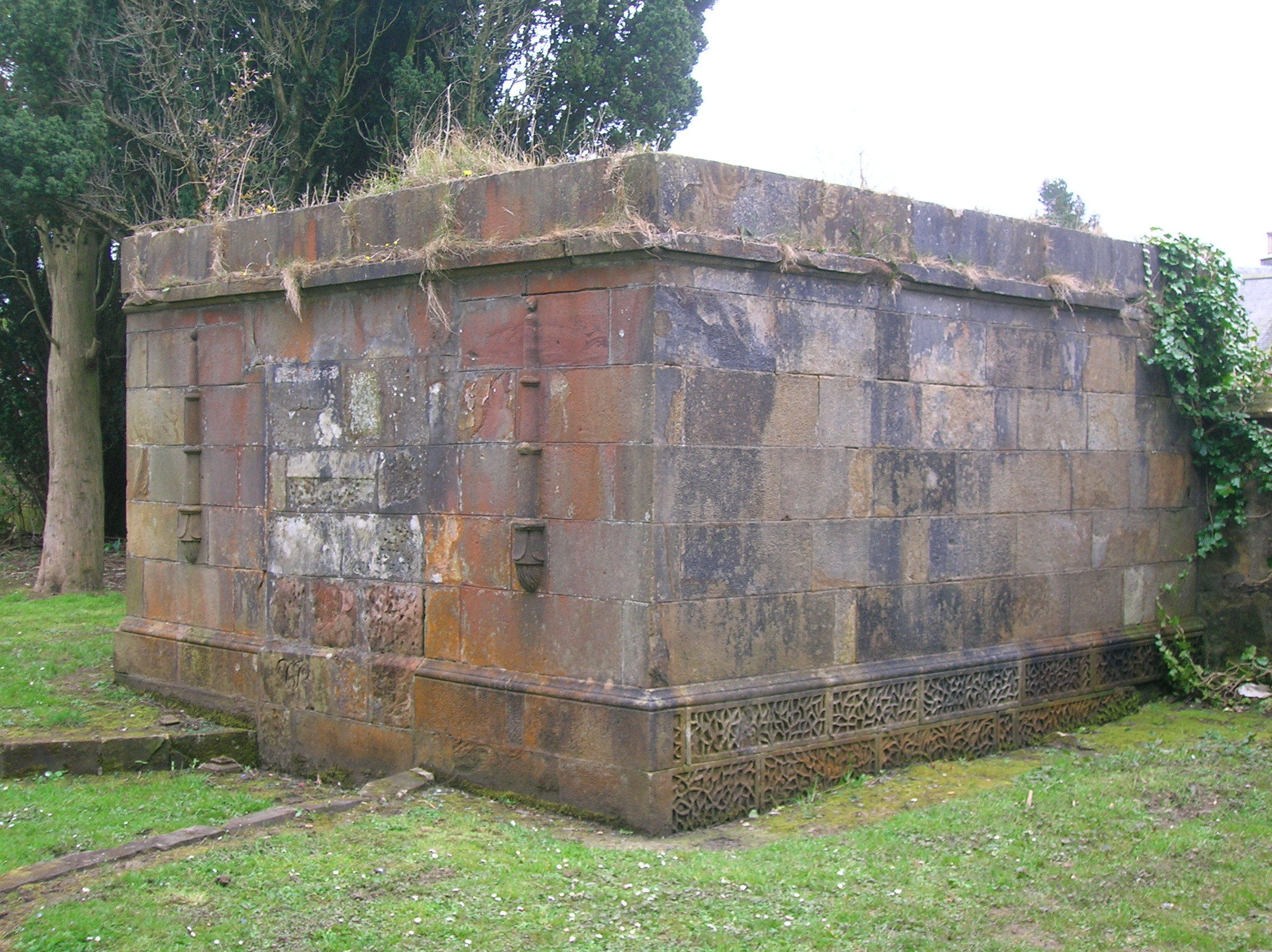
The Mausoleum of the Cunninghames of Lainshaw in the Laigh Kirk cemetery, Stewarton.

The 10th Laird was their son, Sir Walter Montgomerie-Cuninghame, who lost a fortune as result of the American War of Independence. William Cunninghame of Bridgehouse and (afterwards Lainshaw), the 'Tobacco Lord', had made a fortune in America between 1748 and 1762. In 1776 'Linshaw' is shown on road map as occupied by Bowman Esq. In 1779 William Cunninghame purchased Lainshaw from Sir Walter and proceeded to improve the Estate under an agreement whereby the Montgomeries could reclaim the estate only if they could reimburse William for the cost of his improvements. They were never able to do so.

William married three times and had fourteen children. He disinherited his eldest sons Thomas and Alexander and it was his third son, William Cunninghame who inherited the estate in 1799, but did not take up residence until 1804. During his time the house was remodelled extensively. He was a religious eccentric, which led to various court actions and his publishing a wide range of eccentric books, including one against swearing. He never married, having heard his childhood sweetheart utter unacceptably bad language. On his death in 1849, the estate passed to his younger half brother, John Cuninghame of Duchrae, who in turn was succeeded in 1864 by his son John William Herbert, a Captain in the 2nd Life Guards and married in 1867 to Emily, eldest daughter of Major George Graham.

=== The house and estate ===
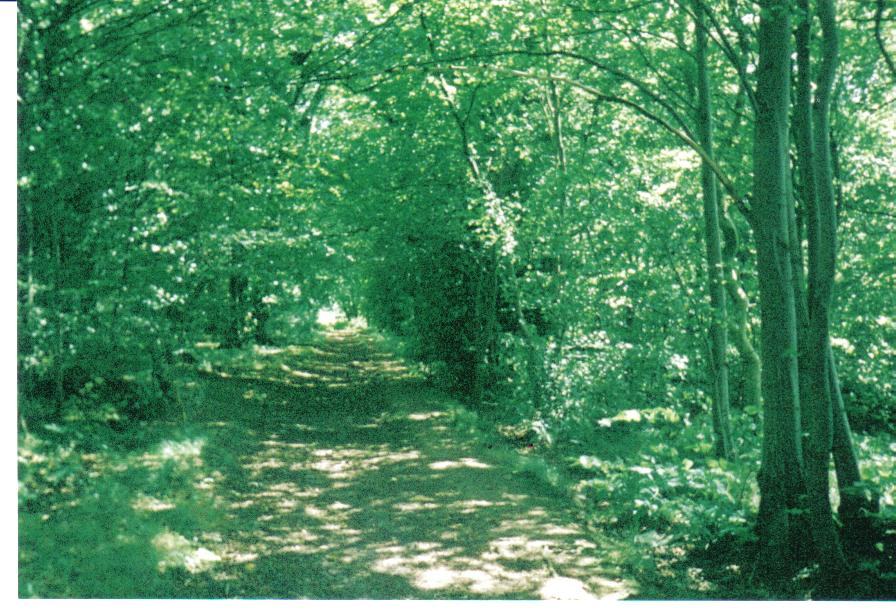
The Coach Road through the policies near the Lainshaw ha-ha

The house remained with the family until it was bought by the local authority in 1947 and became a care home for the elderly. Following a period as a ruin it was restored and converted into a number of apartments. In 1691 the "place of Longshaw [sic] and office houses" had eleven hearths, and the associated dwellings of the "Lands of Longshaw" had over sixty, including Peacockbank. The whale bone arch at the main lodges was constructed from the bones found at the confluence of the Annick Water and the Glazert Water at Water Meetings.

The estate map of 1779 shows a band of woodland running around the estate curtilage. This strip had a carriage-way running through its middle and this links with the ha-ha at the chalybeate spring field. Wide wooden bridges with stone abutments close to the Annick Bridge in Stewarton and close to the walled gardens allowed a complete circuit of the estate curtilage to be made. Only the abutments of these bridges remain.

The old driveway to Lainshaw House off the Stewarton to Torranyard road also has a 'ha-ha' on the side facing the home farm before it reaches the woods. The name ha-ha may be derived from the response of ordinary folk on encountering them and that they were, "...then deemed so astonishing, that the common people called them Ha! Ha's! to express their surprise at finding a sudden and unperceived check to their walk." An alternative theory is that it describes the laughter of those who see a walker fall down the unexpected hole. A seat may have been situated by the ha-ha and the woodland view would have been, and indeed still is, very attractive as this area is clearly an ancient woodland remnant. The stone boundary wall stops in line with the ha-ha.

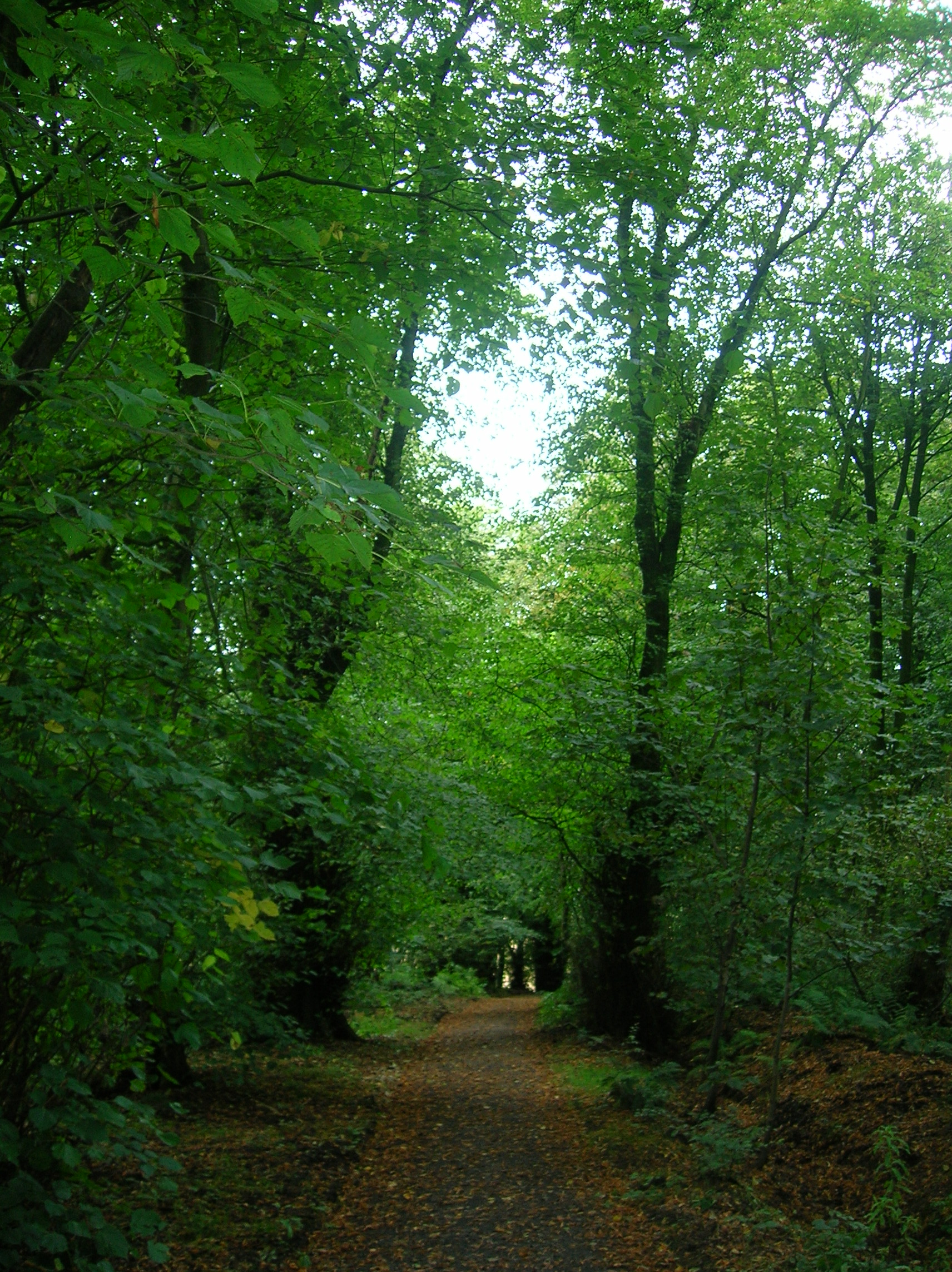
The lime tree avenue in Anderson's Plantation on the old carriage route.

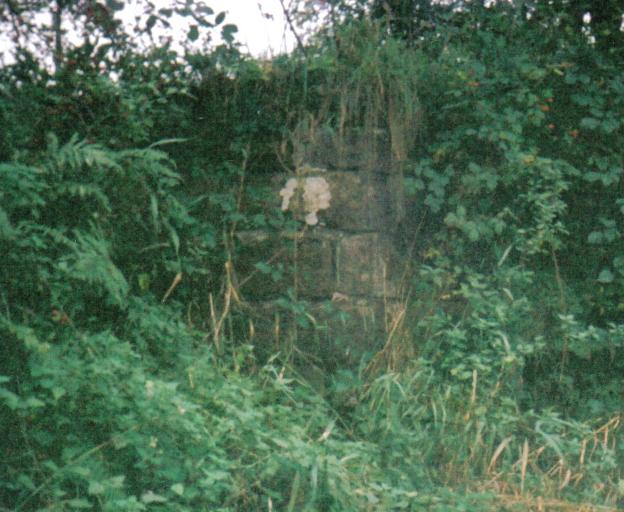
A view of the abutment of the old carriageway bridge over the Annick Water near the old walled gardens.

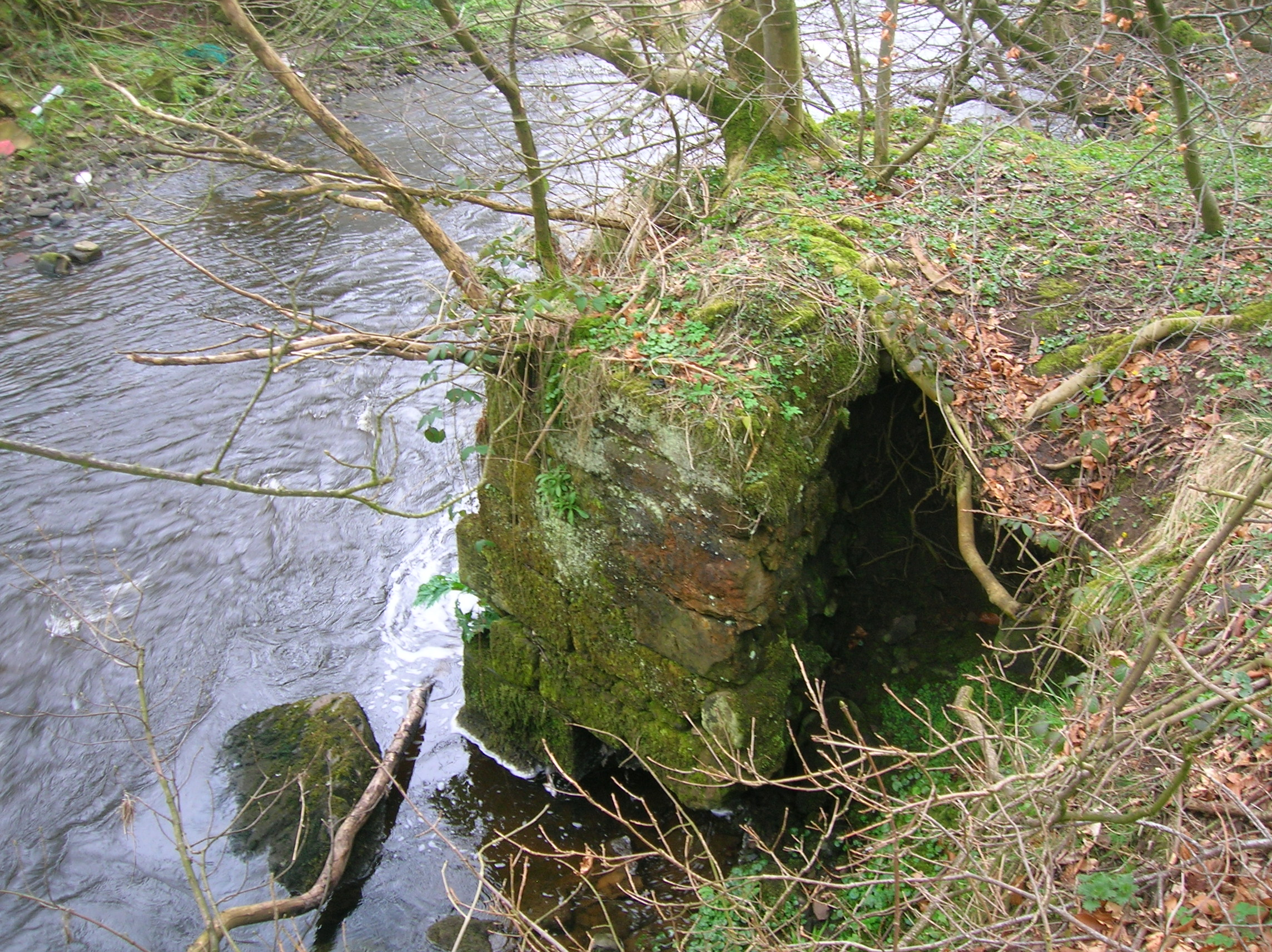
A view of the abutment of the old carriageway bridge over the Annick Water near the Annick Road bridge at Stewarton.

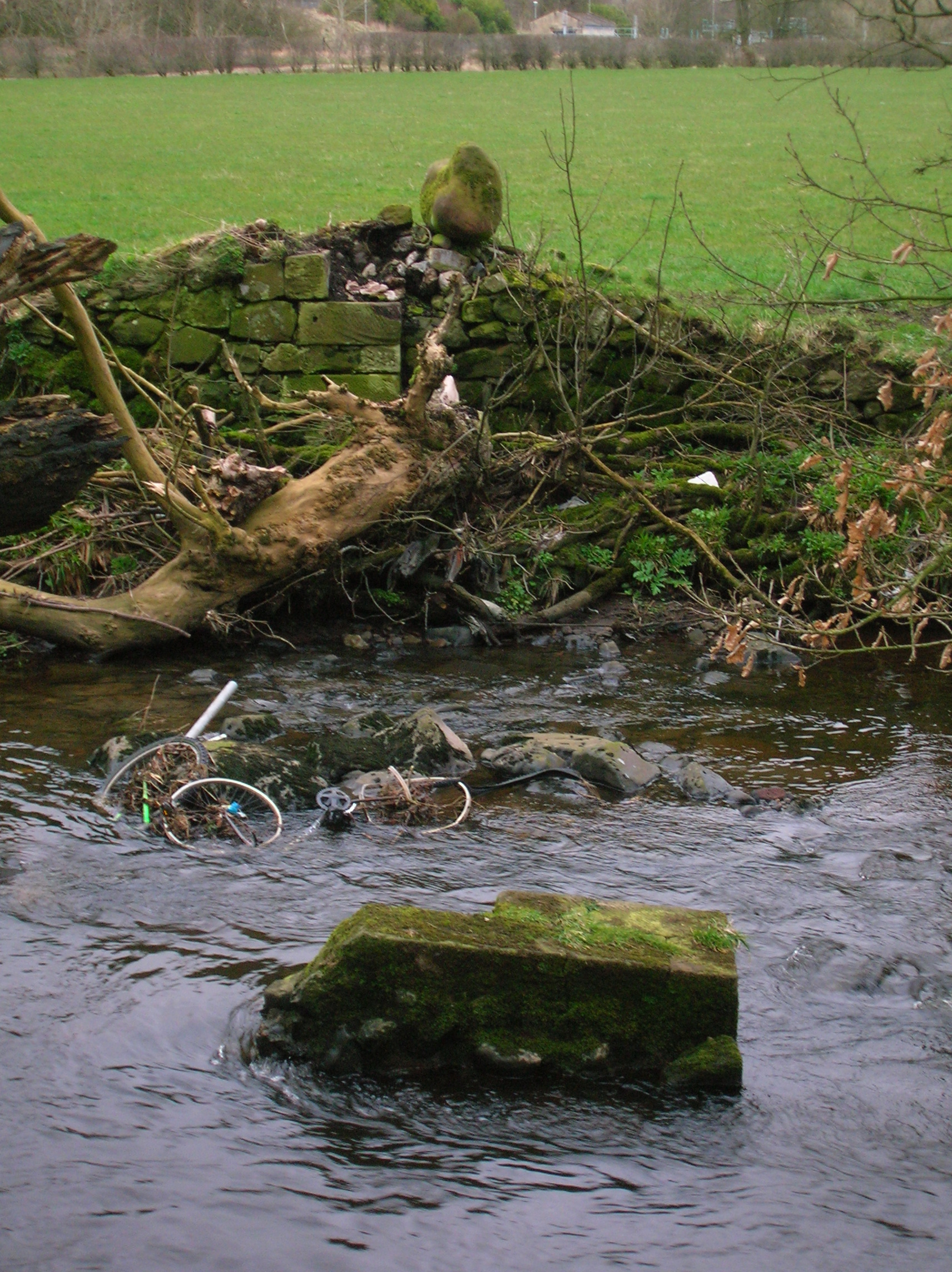
The remains of an old footbridge across the Annick Water.

Near the main entrance is marked a building or buildings called 'Castle-salt', the reason for the name is not known, however salt houses were associated with baronial dwellings and these were used for the storage of salted and preserved foods. It could be that the name 'salt' is a corruption of another word, such as 'soiled' or 'soil', as in the 'night soil', i.e., the midden where the night soil was placed before being taken away for use as fertilizer. A document held in the Scottish National Archive mentions a 'Cattle salt' in Stewarton. In the Laigh Kirk graveyard there is a memorial to Robert Cunningham, erected by James Cunningham of Castle-Salt in 1827. A Mrs. Bracket lived at Castle-salt in 1820, the valued rent being £16. The land around Lainshaw Primary school was known as 'Picken's Park' (originally 'Padzean') and its trees were felled circa 1950, the trees being taken to Bickethall Farm for sawing, etc. Picken was a common local name at the time. Robertson records in 1820 that fields had been drained at considerable expense by filling ditches with stones.

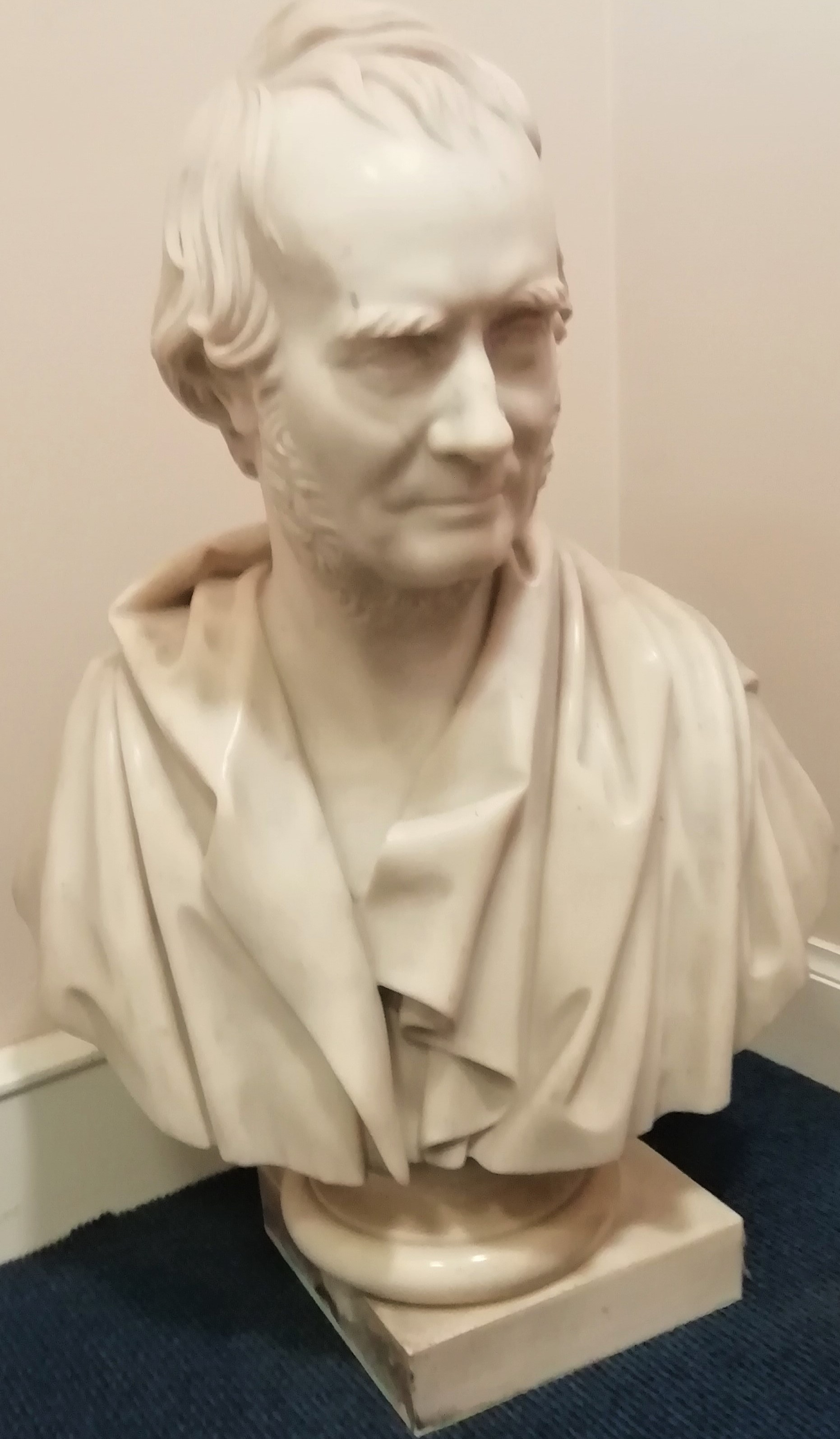
Marble bust of William Cunninghame of Lainshaw d.1879.

In 1779 the estate farms included Gilmill, Kirkmuir, Righead, Parkside, Irvinehill, the Kilbryde Farms, Gouknest, Magbie-hill, Gaimes-hill, Bankend of Bollingshaw, Sandyland of Bollingshaw, Canaan and Clerkland. The rental income from the estate was £1628 per year, a considerable sum (Lainshaw 1779). James Kerr was the 'Baron Officer' at Lainshaw until his death on 4 July 1880. His wife was Barbara Barclay and they were buried at the Laigh Kirk.

The estate wall running from near Freezeland to near the Law Mount was built by unemployed labourers in the early 19th century.

James Forrest of Mid Lambroughton recorded the rare Bird's Nest Orchids and the Lesser Wintergreen plants as growing in the estate woodlands in the 1930s. Locally the woodlands, marked as Anderson's Plantation on some maps, are known as the 'Wendy woods' for some forgotten reason.

==== The chapels ====
Dobie states that two pre-reformation chapels existed locally, one at Lainshaw and one at Chapeltoun. In 1616 the Earl of Eglinton transferred the patronage of Lainshaw Chapel dedicated to the Virgin Mary, to Sir Neil Montgomerie of Lainshaw, but by 1661 it was back with the Earl. After the Reformation the chapel's endowment was appropriated by the patron and the chapel allowed to fall into ruins. No remains of the chapel now exist. Paterson suggests that only one chapel existed and this was at Chapeltoun or Chapel. Sanderson states the chapel of the Virgin Mary at Lainshaw was under the patronage of the earls of Eglinton.

==== The Lainshaw Sundial ====
A lectern style sundial was located at Lainshaw, similar to the lectern at Ladyland but with two steps and hemi-cylinders towards the South rather than one; it is now at Hensol House near Castle Douglas. The sundial plinth has the Cuninghame coat of arms and the initials SAC DMS, for Sir Alexander Cuninghame (d. 1685) and his wife, Dame Margaret Stewart (m. 1665) who lived at Corsehill Castle; the dial may have been taken to Lainshaw when the family moved in 1779. The date of construction may have been 1672, when Sir Alexander was created Baronet or in 1673, when he became a freemason.

==== The Lainshaw Cycle and pedestrian path ====
The Stewarton Woodland Action Trust have created a network of public access paths, some of which run through the old Lainshaw Estate lands.

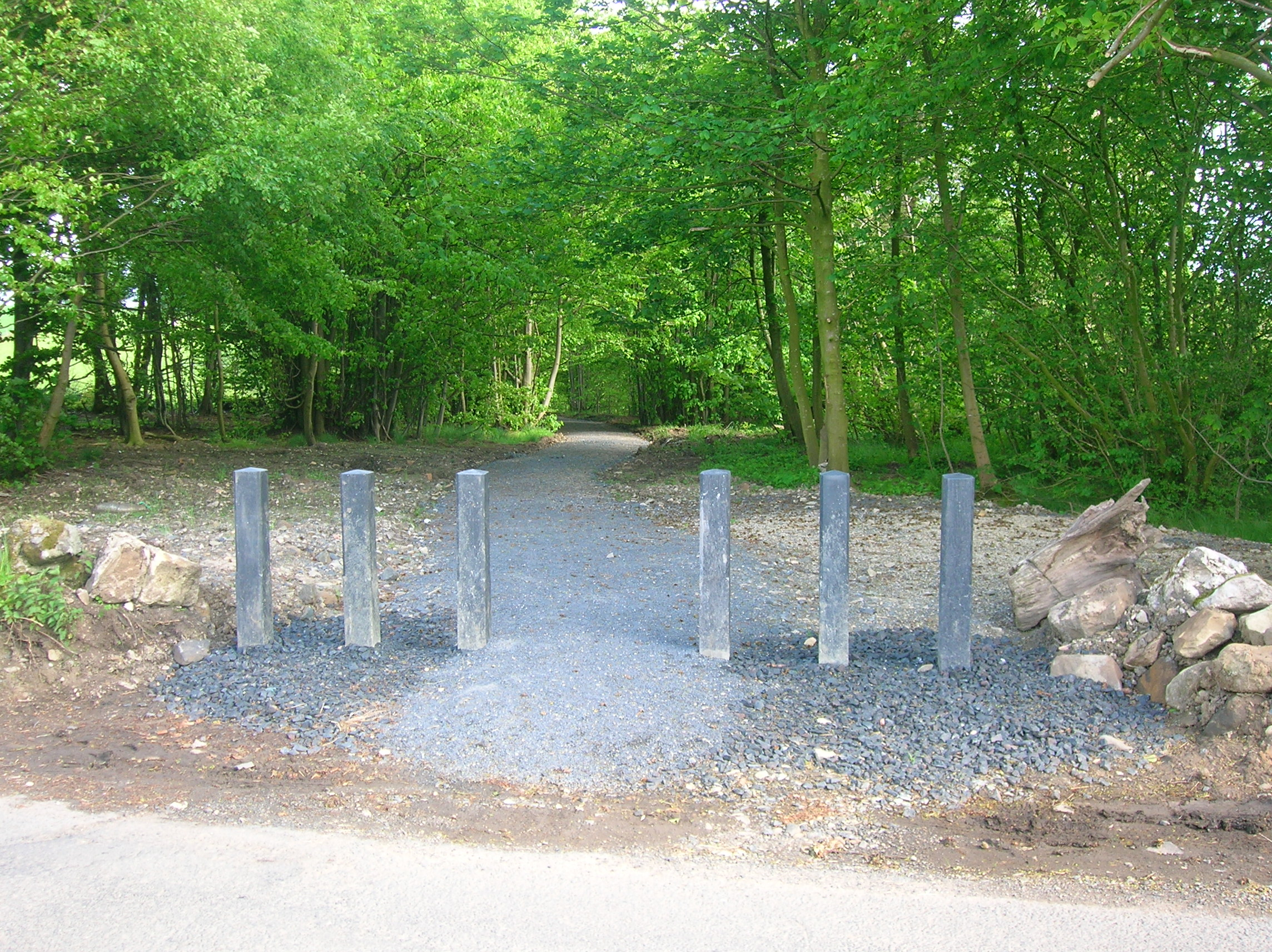
The entrance to the cycle and pedestrian path off the Stewarton to Torranyard road near Gill Mill farm.

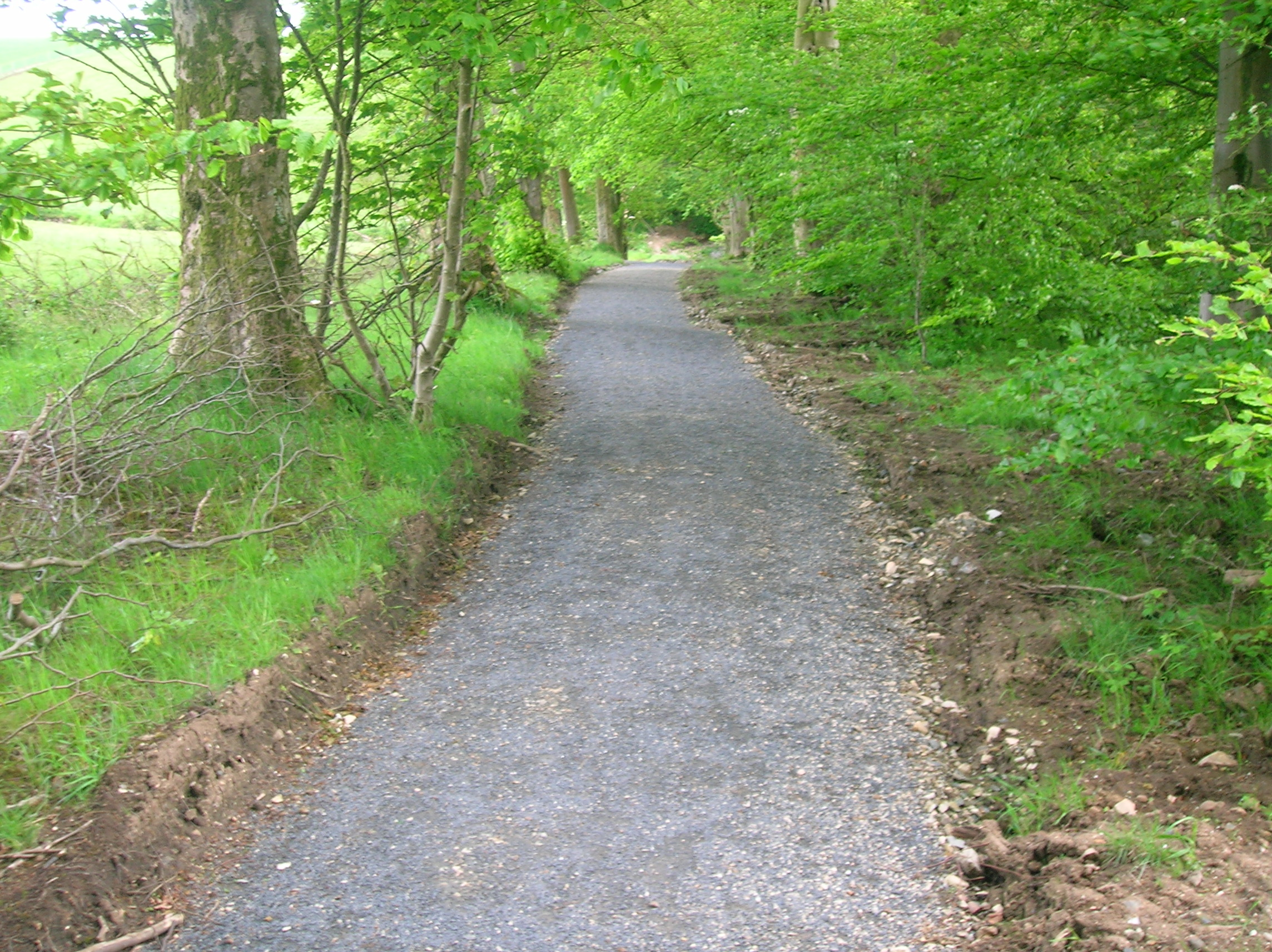
A portion of the path looking up from the Chapelburn at the Anderson Plantation.

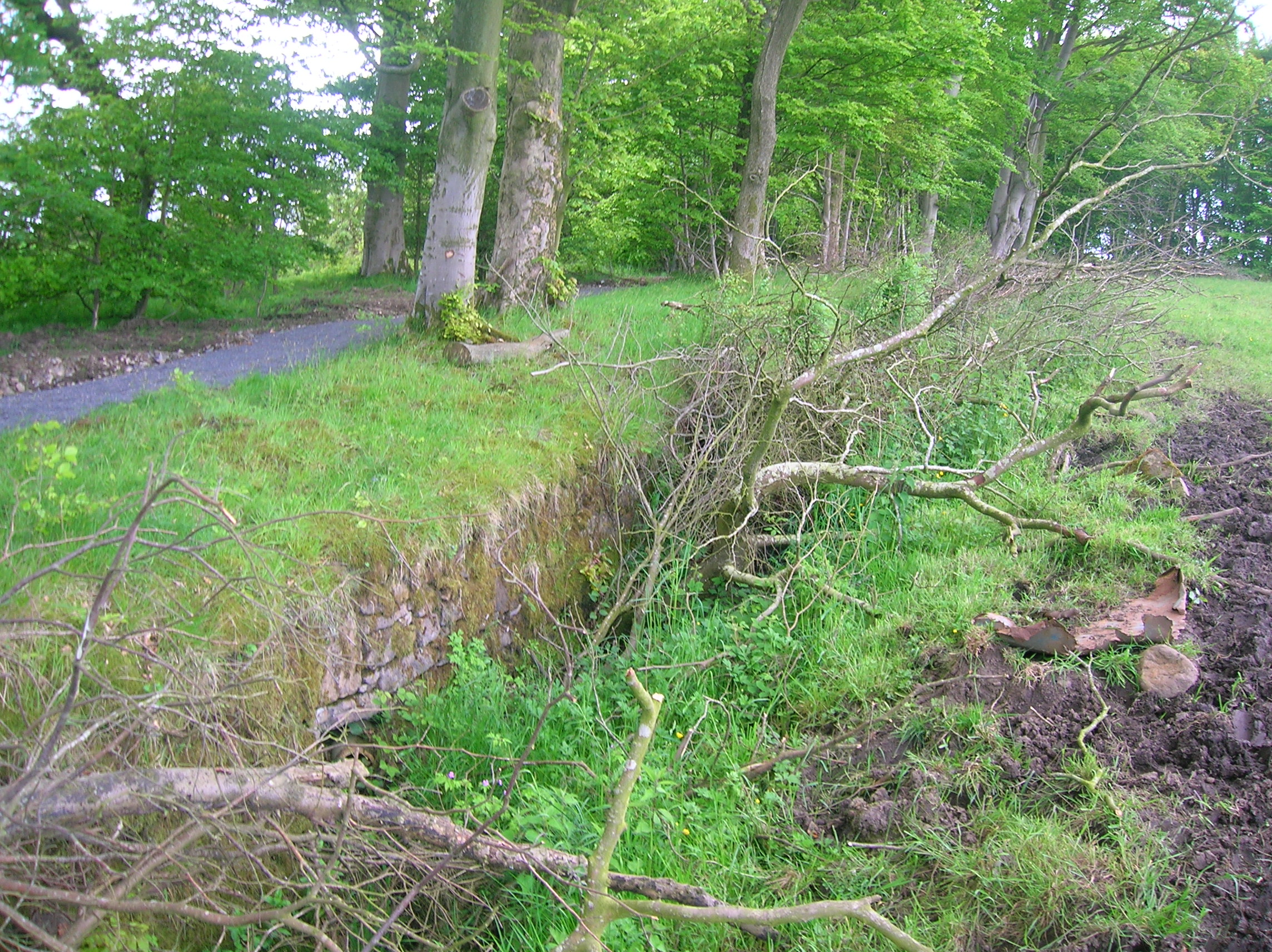
The Ha-ha at Lainshaw near the Chalybeate spring and the Chapelburn.

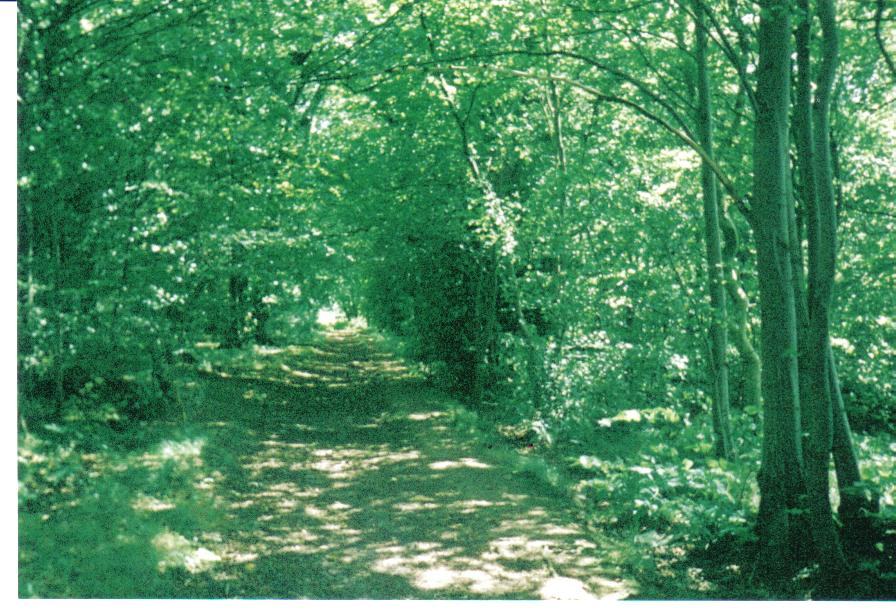
The same 'Coach Road' through the policies near the Lainshaw Ha-ha in 2006.

== The Murder of the Earl of Eglinton at the Annick Ford ==
The Murder of Hugh Montgomerie, 4th Earl of Eglinton at the Annick Ford in Stewarton, East Ayrshire, Scotland, took place in 1586 as a consequence of a long running feud between the Montgomeries, Earls of Eglinton and the Cunninghames, Earls of Glencairn, families who were competing for power and influence locally and nationally. The significant repercussions of this act were felt throughout the county of Ayrshire and beyond. The spelling 'Montgomerie' is used throughout for both the family and Montgomery for the clan and clan and district names 'Cunninghame' in the same fashion.

== The Highland host ==
To prevent the Covenanters holding 'Conventicles', King Charles II moved highland troops, the 'Highland Host' into the west-land of Ayrshire. "They took free quarters; they robbed people on the high road; they knocked down and wounded those who complained; they stole, and wantonly destroyed, cattle; they subjected people to the torture of fire to discover to them where their money was hidden; they threatened to burn down houses if their demands were not at once complied with; besides free quarters they demanded money every day; they compelled even poor families to buy brandy and tobacco for them; they cut and wounded people from sheer devilment." The cost of all this amounted to £6062 12s 8d in Stewarton parish alone.

== The Bloak mineral well and the chalybeate spring ==
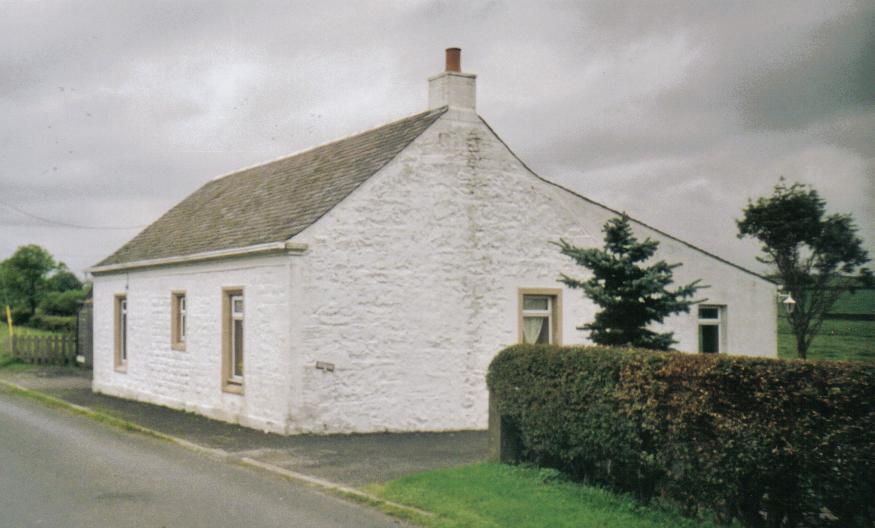
A view of Bloak Well, now 'Salt Well'

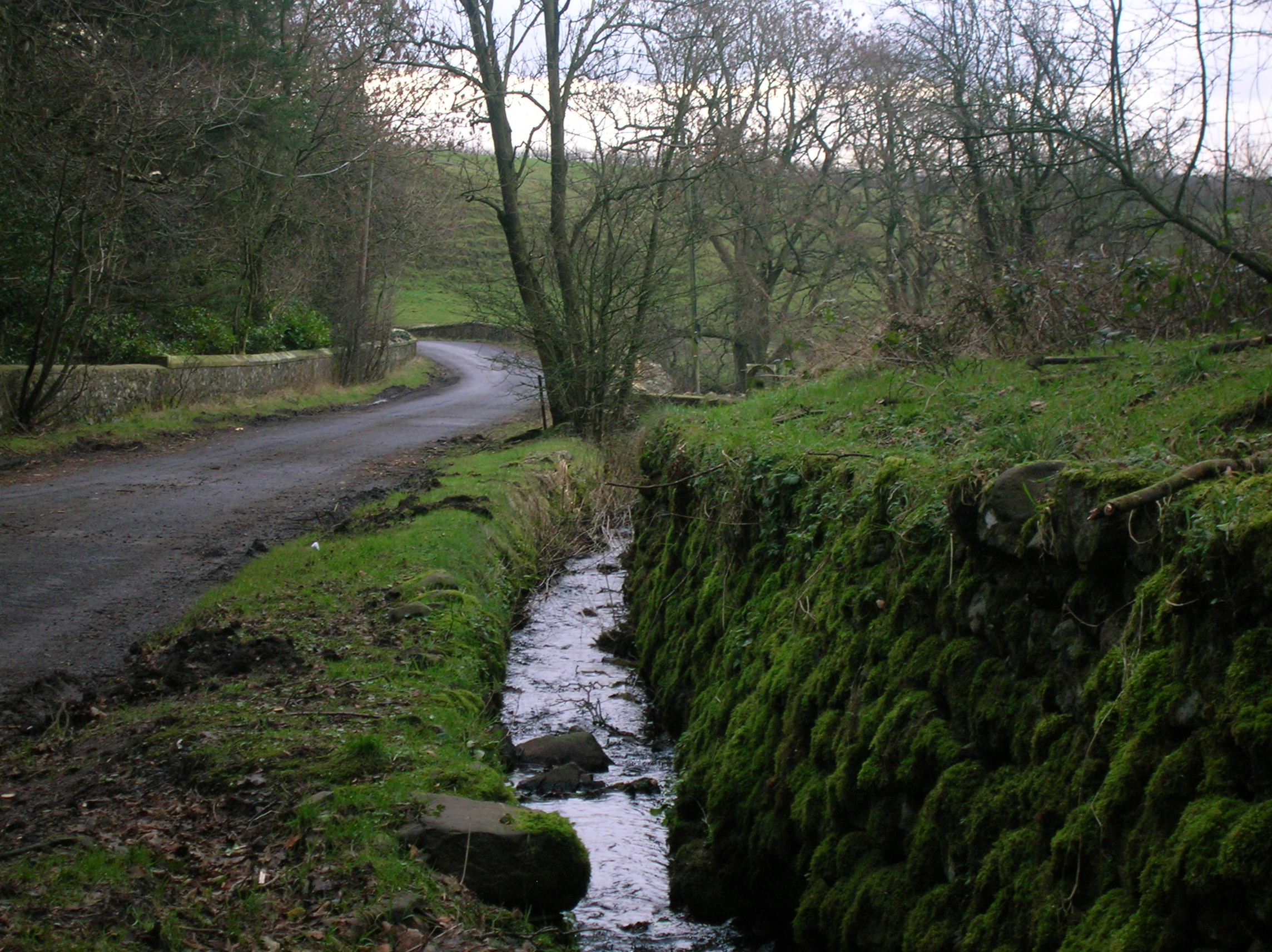
The Chapel Burn near its confluence with the Annick Water

Paterson states that there is a mineral spring near Stewarton, called the Bloak Well. It was discovered through the observation that pigeons from Lainshaw House and the neighbouring parishes were found to flock here to drink. Mr. Cunningham of Lainshaw built a handsome house over the well in 1833 and appointed a keeper to take care of it as the mineral water was of some value owing to healing properties attributed to it. The well was located in the middle of the kitchen.

The Chapel Burn rises near the Anderson Plantation in the fields below Lainshaw Mains and it is marked as a chalybeate or mineral spring on the 1911 6" OS map. Bore holes nearby suggest that the water was put to a more formal use at one time, supplying cattle troughs or possibly even for a stand pipe as mineral water was popular for its supposed curative properties. According to the opinion of the day, it could cure the colic, the melancholy, and the vapours; it made the lean fat, the fat lean; it killed flat worms in the belly, loosened the clammy humours of the body, and dried the over-moist brain. The main spring here has been covered over and the water piped out to the burn.

The chalybeate spring (otherwise known as siderite, a mineral consisting of iron(II) carbonate, FeCO_{3} - 48 per cent iron) described here is not the only well/spring in the area which is identified as being a mineral spring, for there is still a cottage named Saltwell in what was the hamlet of Bloak. This information is stated by the Topographical Dictionary of Scotland, however Mrs. Florence Miller of Saltwell recollects that this well was never known specifically as the Bloak Well. The present building was purchased from the Cunninghames of Lainshaw in the 1920s, having been built between 1800 and 1850. It is thought that the salt well now lies beneath the floor of the building and various physical features of the building suggest that it is the structure built by the Cunninghames. The well was first discovered by the fact that migrating birds, especially swifts and swallows, flocked to it. It is of unknown composition and is not listed as chalybeate. The cottage was a 'but and ben' and it is a 'handsome' building as described by Paterson. A Redwells Farm is located nearby at Auchentiber, the etymology of tiber itself refers to a well.

== James Boswell ==
David Laing was the closest relative and therefore heir to Lord Lyle of Lainshaw, a judge of the court session. Laing took the surname Montgomerie and married Veronica Boswell, sister of Alexander Boswell, Lord Auchinleck.

James Boswell of Auchinleck House, the famous biographer and friend of Dr. Samuel Johnson was married in 1769 to his cousin, the youngest daughter of David, Margaret Montgomerie in Lainshaw Castle. He had gone to Ireland with Margaret, with the intention of courting another wealthy cousin, however he fell in love with the penniless Margaret and married her instead. The room they were married in was one floor above the room in which the Earl of Eglinton was laid after he was murdered by Cunninghame at the old brig or ford on the Annick Water near the entrance to the castle on the Stewarton road.

== Micro-history ==
Jane Montgomerie (nee Maxwell) was engaged to Alexander Montgomerie, 10th Earl of Eglinton. Jane was the widow of James Montgomerie of Lainshaw. The couple were never married owing to the earl's murder at Ardrossan.

536 GT Coy RASC carried out their first training on DUKWs on the Annick Water in the winter of 1943/44. The river in front of Lainshaw House was dammed to form a lake and this could have been the site. The dam has now burst and this happened by the end of the war, possibly due to the DUKWs.

Lainshaw was known in the 19th century as the Lainshaw, Kirkwood and Bridgehouse Estate in the Register of Sasines.

In 1920 William Henry Goff purchased Lainshaw from the Cunninghame family.

The church at Stewarton was at one time held by the Cuninghames of Lainshaw.

The name Stewarton is said to derive from Walter, High Steward of Scotland to David I who lived here in the 12th. century. Robert the Steward, a direct descendant, became King Robert II. The town had 1800 inhabitants in 1820. Walter was the son of Alain who had been invited by Henry I to live in England. He returned to Scotland with King David I in 1141.

The Gallery of Modern Art (GOMA) is a neo-classical building in Royal Exchange Square in the Glasgow city centre, which was built in 1778 as the townhouse of William Cunninghame of Lainshaw, a wealthy tobacco lord. The building has undergone a series of different uses; It was used by the Royal Bank of Scotland; it then became the Royal Exchange. Reconstruction for this use resulted in many additions to the building, namely the Corinthian pillars to the Queen Street facade, the cupola above and the large hall to the rear of the old house.

Timothy Pont in 1604 - 08 records that so thickly was the district about Stewarton and along the banks of the Irvine populated for a space of three or four miles (6 km) "that well travelled men in divers parts of Europe (affirm) that they have seen walled cities not so well or near planted with houses so near each other as they are here, wherethrough it is so populous that, at the ringing of a bell in the night for a few hours, there have seen convene 3000 able men, well-horsed and armed."

In the 1600s Stuartoune had fairs on the first Thursday of January, the first Monday of May, and the last Wednesday of October. A weekly market on Thursdays is recorded as being not well attended.

In 1820 only six people were qualified to vote as freeholders in Stewarton Parish, being proprietors of Robertland (Hunter Blair), Kirkhill (Col. J. S. Barns), Kennox (McAlester), Lainshaw (Cunninghame), Lochridge (Stewart) and Corsehill (Montgomery-Cunninghame).

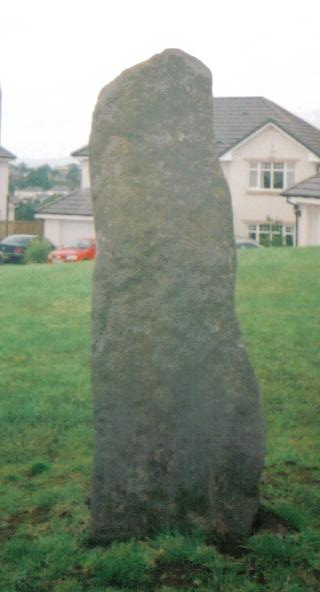
The Draffen Stone outside Draffen House (previously Upper Lochridge in Stewarton)

The 'Stewarton Sickness' refers to the powerful religious revival that started in 1625 and continued to involve Stewartonians in strong religious attitudes until comparatively recent times.

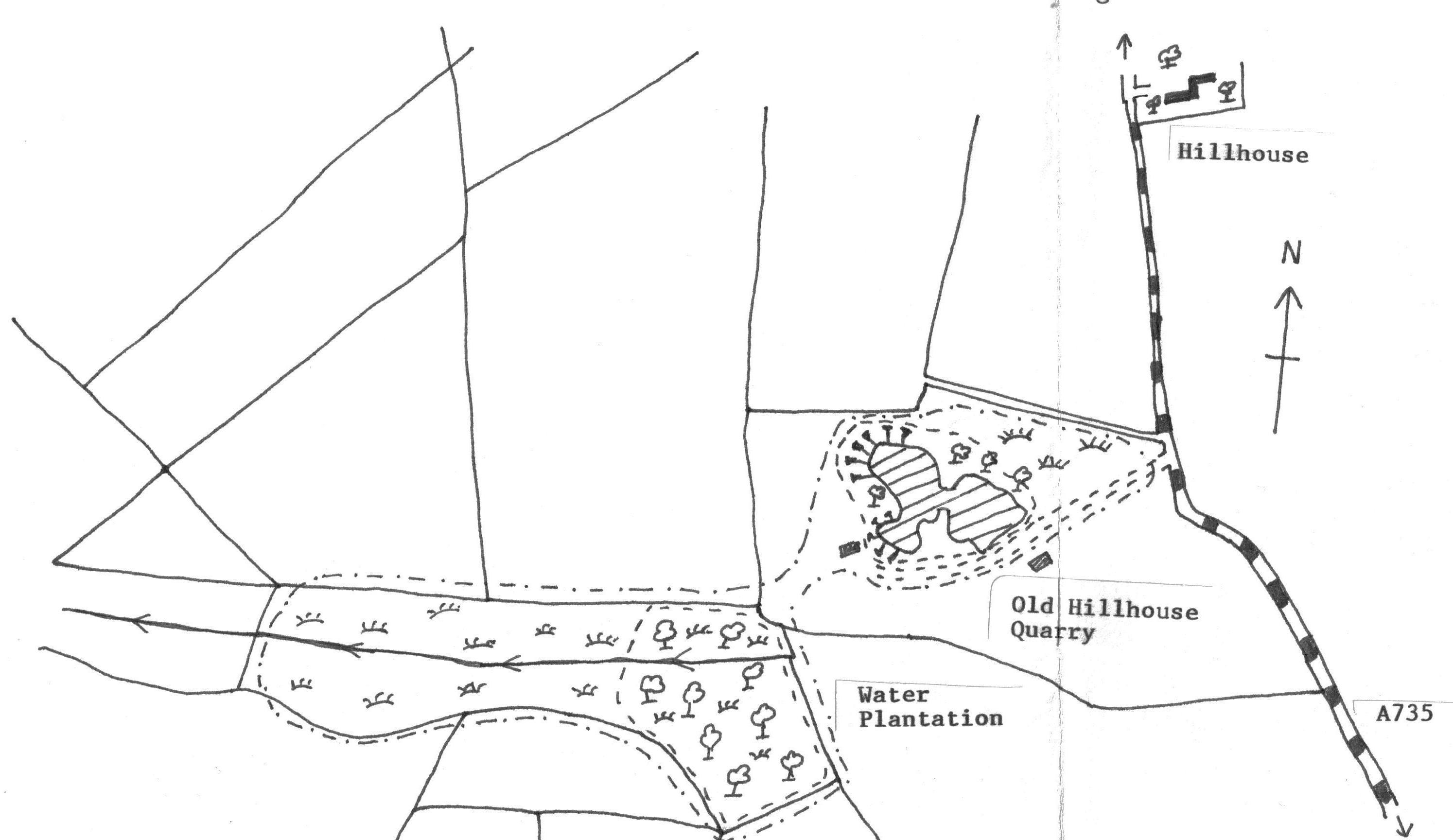
Old Hillhouse quarry and the Water plantation.

Lainshaw Mill

Lainshaw Mill, previously Peacockbank Mill, below the railway viaduct, was famous for the large Rowan Tree growing out of its chimney. The mill ceased grinding corn in the 1930s and was completely demolished in the second half of the 20th. Century after a disastrous fire, the fate of many an old mill. In the 1860 William Eaglesham was the miller, with his wife Helen Wilson. He died aged 70 and is buried in the Laigh Kirk graveyard. The Lainshaw viaduct was opened on August 3. 1868, but did not actually have track and trains running over it until March 1871. Colonel Mure of Caldwell performed the opening ceremony.

The 1779 Lainshaw estate map shows the Glebe meadows running down from the Laigh Church to the river and as far as the Old Stewarton Road at Kirkford.

In 1797 Magbie Hill above Stewarton has a field called 'Stone Field' which may record a standing stone now long destroyed or possibly moved as the nearby farm has two large boulders in front of it. Coal pits are marked in the vicinity of Magbie (MacBeth) Hill, possibly explaining the name, as 'mag' was a term used for poor quality coal. The nearby 'Water Plantation' was known as 'Magbie-hill Plantation'.

Stewarton stands on the old turnpike, completed from Glasgow by Lugton, to Kilmarnock, Irvine and Ayr in 1820 at the cost of £18,000.

== See also ==
- Cunninghamhead
- Chapeltoun
- Lambroughton
- Stones of Scotland
- House of Stuart
- Cunninghamhead, Perceton and Annick Lodge
- Kirkwood Estate, East Ayrshire
