= Stewarton hive =

The Stewarton hive is a type of historical bee hive. Extra boxes below allowed expansion of the brood, and thus strongly inhibited swarming and any tendency for the queen to enter the honey boxes, while expansion with extra honey boxes above the brood area gave ample space for the bees to create surplus honey stores that were easily harvested by the beekeeper. The introduction of this hive is credited to Robert Kerr, of Stewarton, Ayrshire, in 1819.

During the last quarter of the twentieth century, workers at Rothamsted Experimental Station built and operated a Stewarton, demonstrating some of the old claims for the design. Others continue to operate the hive today.

== History ==
Little is known about the detail of the earliest Stewartons, but during the second half of the 19th century several enthusiasts recorded the detail of the design and their experience of using the hive. Most notable of these was John McCulloch McPhedran, who wrote regularly in the British Bee Journal as 'The Renfrewshire Beekeeper'. More recently, Dr. Eva Crane has summarised information, although, as with many aspects of bee keeping history, detail appears to have been overlooked, and a few 'modern myths' have been allowed to develop. Crane correctly asserts that the Stewarton "kept the queen out of the honey boxes" thus allowing the beekeeper to secure a crop of honey free from contamination from brood. However, the Stewarton hive was apparently the first to allow unlimited expansion simply by adding extra boxes.

== Octagonal and observation hives ==
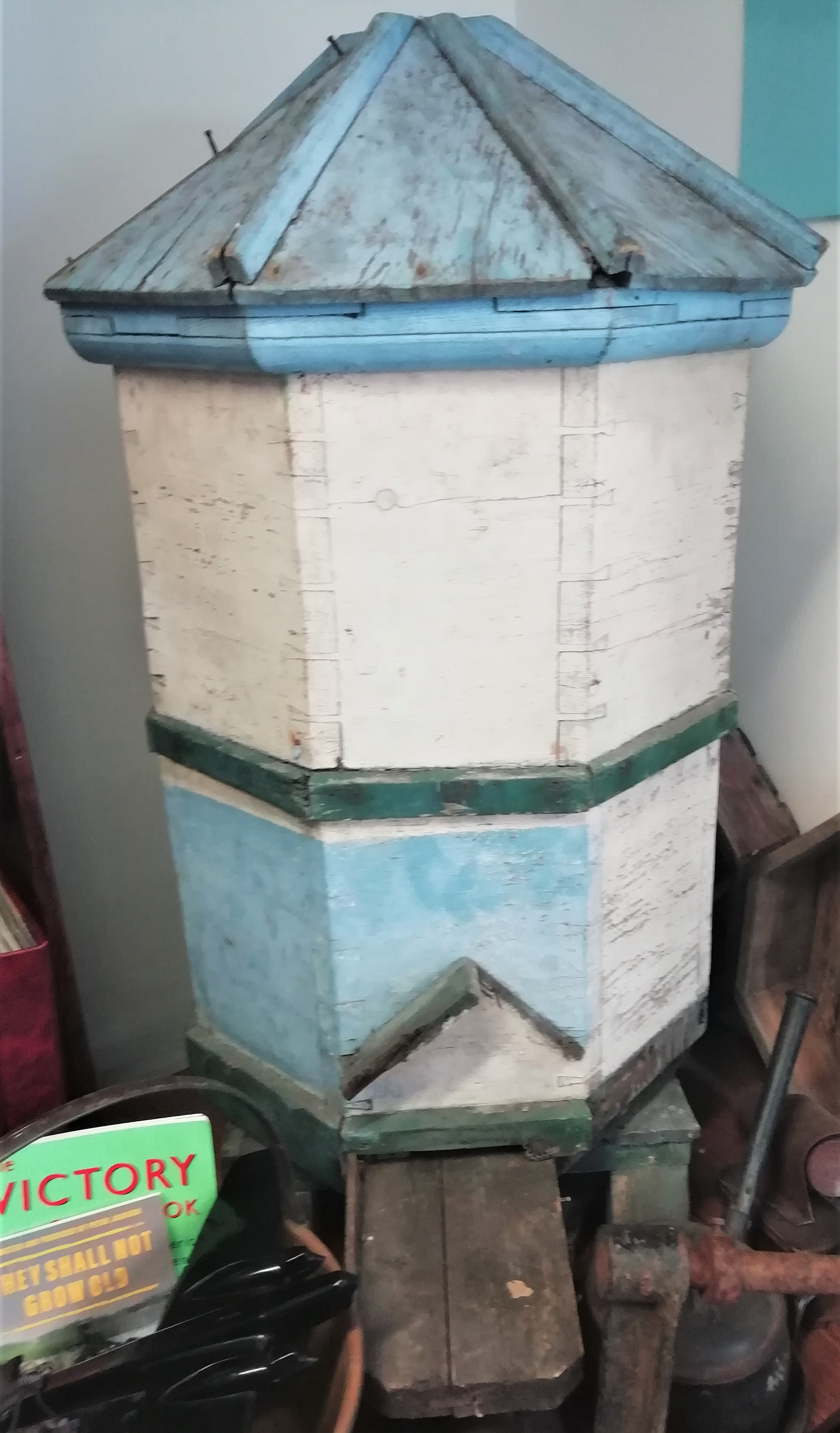
A Stewarton Hive in the town's museum

The Stewarton hive was not the first octagonal bee hive. The Reverend William Mew, of Eastington, Stroud, Gloucestershire, can be identified as the originator of a 'transparent' hive. It followed a design mentioned in Pliny, and was described in 1655 by Samuel Hartlib, in The Reformed Common-Wealth of Bees.

This hive was almost certainly the inspiration for the octagonal hives recorded by Christopher Wren and John Evelyn. The available evidence challenges as myth the idea that Wren was himself a 'bee master'; it is more likely that he simply cooperated with his mentor, John Wilkins, and drew the hive that several were interested in. John Evelyn records in his Diary his experience with these hives, but left an illustration of a hive that has features that clearly link with the Stewarton. David Smith worked on Evelyn's unpublished manuscript material for his Elysium Britannicum and published this in 1965. Crane says this was written "about 1655" but Evelyn's illustration of an octagonal hive appears to be much later.

Hattie Ellis describes John Evelyn's hive as "stripped down", as it was in one of Christopher Wren's first architectural drawings, (it was) a stack of wooden boxes with small holes between them so the bees could leave their honey in one box and crawl down to the next". Ellis uses Evelyn's illustration of this hive but overlooks that, whereas Wren's drawing does show "small holes", there is no corresponding hole in Evelyn's drawing: the central area is occupied by a fixed board with moveable boards on either side. These function in exactly the same way as the top bars and sliders in the Stewarton Hive. Thus, Evelyn appears to have invented a queen excluder system about 150 years before anyone else. Furthermore, close examination of Evelyn's drawing seems to show quite clearly that Evelyn began to draw a hexagonal hive, but changed his mind and completed it as an octagon. Thus Ellis is probably wrong when she claims that the octagonal hive "was the cabinet-maker's approximation of the honey bee's round nest". If this was so in Evelyn's hive, then he would have drawn an octagon at the outset. The octagon was necessary to allow the insertion of the queen excluding board. This was no cabinet-maker's fancy, but a deliberate technological device.

Eva Crane discusses John Evelyn's hive in her chapter on the history of observation hives. While any 'transparent' hive with glass windows or sides allows observation of the bees without opening the hive, the Stewarton hive uses windows at the front and back as part of the system for managing the hives. When the sliders are inserted in the central portion of the box at the top of the brood nest, inhibiting the queen from laying above, moving them to the sides allows workers to begin drawing comb and storing honey at the sides of the honey box above. As the nectar flow proceeds, and more honey is stored, the workers build this comb from both sides towards the centre. The beekeeper can establish whether the bees require more space by opening the windows. If light can be seen, comb building in that box is not finished and no super is required. If the view through the windows is obscured by comb and bees, then that box is nearly full and a new box can be added above.
