= Lainshaw Castle =

House in East Ayrshire, Scotland

Coordinates: 55.6748°N 4.5297°W

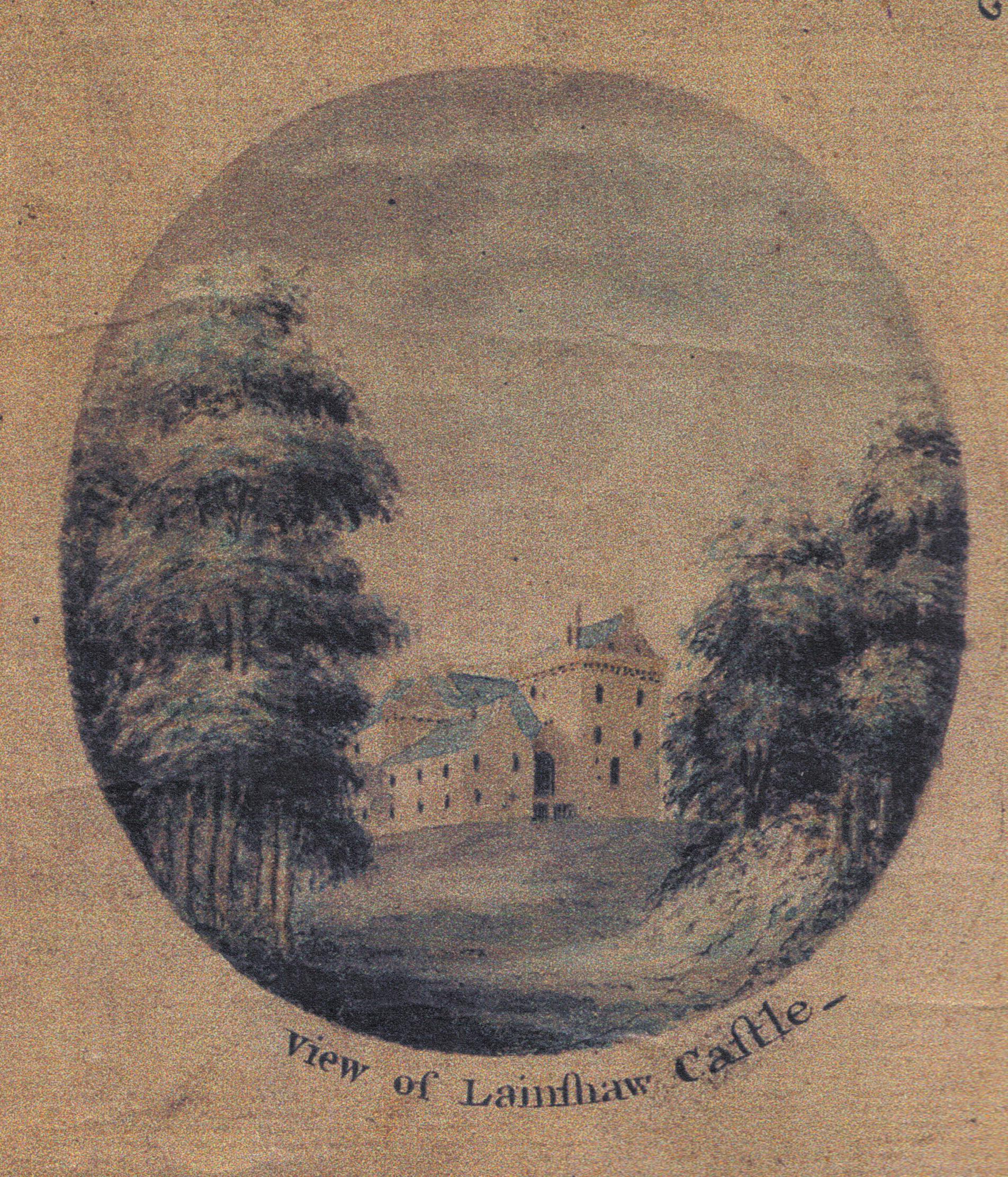
Lainshaw Castle in the 17th century

Lainshaw Castle was a 15th century castle about 1.0 mile (1.6 km) south-west of Stewarton, East Ayrshire, Scotland, to the north of Annick Water. The castle was incorporated into Lainshaw House over the course of the 17th and 18th centuries.

== History ==
The castle belonged to the Stewarts and served as the baronial castle of Stewarton, but in 1570 it passed to the Montgomeries. William Cunninghame, one of the tobacco lords, bought it in 1779 from Sir Walter Montgomerie-Cunninghame, 10th Laird of Lainshaw, who had been impoverished by the American War of Independence. The rear three-storey wing may have been built by Cunninghame. Inheriting the estate upon his father's death in 1799, his third son, William, began an extensive program of modernising the structure in the classical style; in 1824 a Tudor-Gothic extension was added.

== Structure ==
Lainshaw Castle was described by Timothy Pont in 1608 as 'a stronge old Dunijon'.

In the present structure most of the ground-floor walls and the face of the south-east wall to a height of over 11 metres (36.1 ft) belong to the original castle. Two small ground-floor windows and a larger third-floor window with roll moulding are prominent among features remaining. The surviving walls have been pierced by various doorway, providing access to later structural additions, with some subsequently being blocked. Three different rooflines are may be seen on the south eastern wall face. While there is little sound dating evidence for this structure, it is thought to date from between the late 15th century to the early 16th century.
