= William Cunninghame =

British businessman (1731–1799)

William Cunninghame of Lainshaw (1731–1799) was a Scottish merchant and leading Tobacco Lord who headed one of the major Glasgow syndicates that came to dominate the transatlantic tobacco trade. Most of the tobacco shipped from North American slave plantations was sold to France. He later also made a further fortune stockpiling tobacco bought at keen prices shortly before the American Revolution, assuming that Great Britain would not be able to retain control over her rebellious colonies, and then selling at high prices. Cunninghame's (much altered and expanded) neo-classical house on Glasgow's Queen Street today houses the collection of the Gallery of Modern Art.

== Early life ==
Cunninghame was born in 1731 in Kilmarnock, Ayrshire, into a prosperous merchant family. He was a blood relative of Andrew Cochrane of Brighouse (1693–1777), who was one of Glasgow's most respected Lord Provosts. Family ties were of great importance in helping to build Cunninghame's growing fortune.

== Career ==
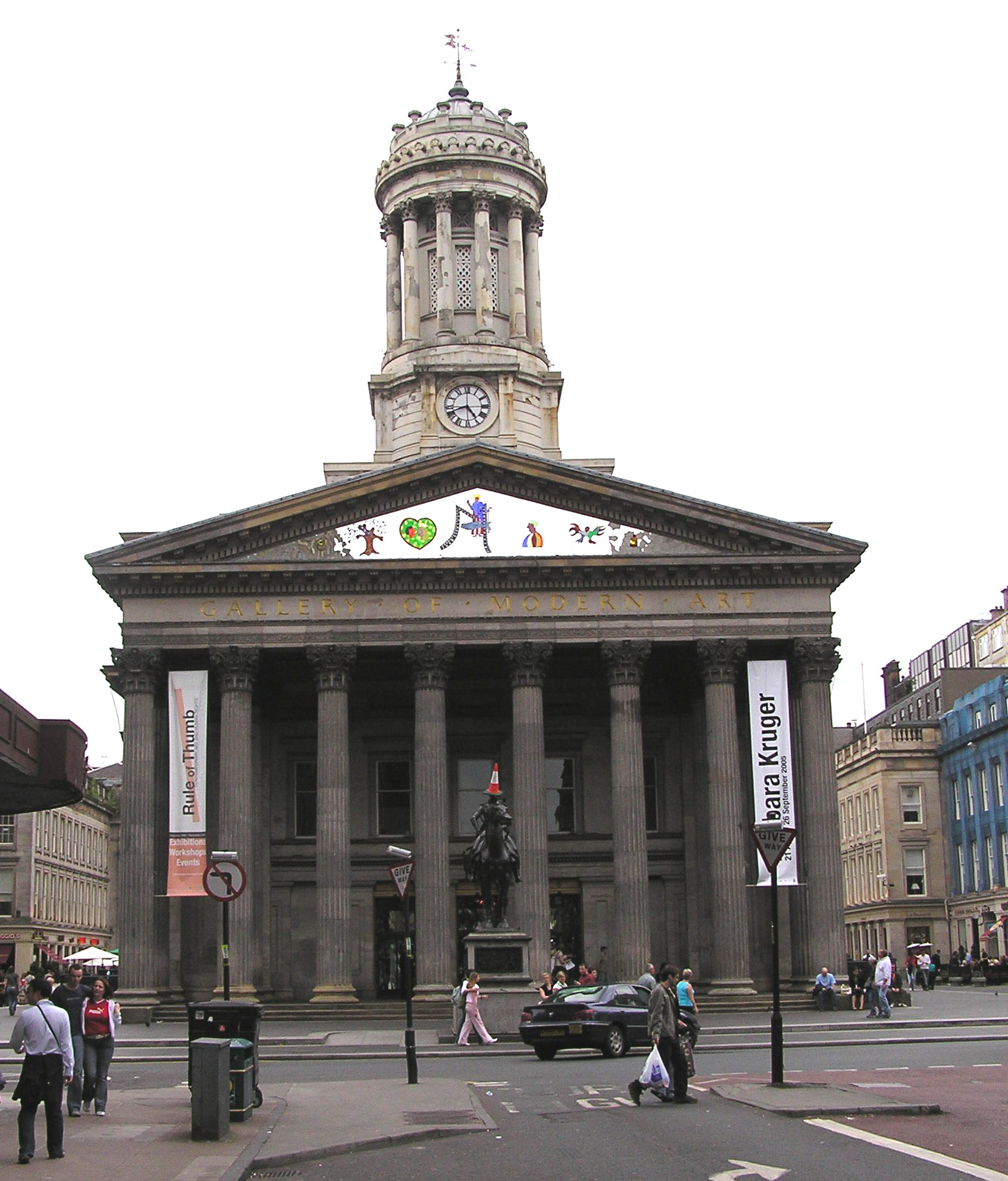
William Cunninghame's neo-classical mansion on Queens St, Glasgow, built in 1780 at a cost of £10,000

Cunninghame first sailed to America in 1746 as a young apprentice in the firm of Cochrane, Murdoch & Company. After four years of training he was promoted to become a manager and in 1752 he came to oversee all the company business in Virginia.

In 1762 he returned to Scotland, where he became the principal partner in the firm of Cochrane, Murdoch & Co. By the early 1770s he changed the company name to William Cunninghame & Company, and it grew to become one of the city's five largest importers.

Twice a year his flagship – named The Cunninghame – arrived in the Chesapeake Bay, loaded with European luxury goods such as silverware and furniture, and ready to collect Tobacco for export back to Europe. Cunninghame, like the other Glasgow merchants, extended credit to the growers enabling them to buy goods from the company store before their tobacco was sold at market. However, many growers found themselves deeply in debt and thereby forced to accept low prices for their crop. Cunninghame was known to offer prices as much as 10% below market value to distressed growers.

== American Revolution ==
Cunninghame made an even greater fortune from the tobacco scarcity caused by the American War of Independence. On the outbreak of war, Cunningham's business partners found themselves in possession of substantial stocks of tobacco which they had purchased for around three pence per pound. As war began to disrupt the trade the price rose, and Cunningham's partners, confident that the rebellious colonists would soon be defeated, sold out their stock at sixpence per pound. Cunningham took the opposite view and he personally purchased their entire stock. Eventually, as the long war disrupted supplies, the price of tobacco rose to a staggering 3 shillings and sixpence, making a huge fortune for Cunninghame.

Like many wealthy Glasgow merchants, Cunninghame used some of his profits to buy a country estate. In 1778 he purchased for £26,200 for the estate of Lainshaw, in Ayrshire. He also purchased a property in the Cow Loan in Glasgow, which he renamed Queen Street after the wife of George III, and in 1780 he built there a large mansion in the neo-classical style at a cost of £10,000, an immense sum at the time.

In 1779 he completed his rise to the wealthy landed gentry by registering his family coat-of-arms at the office of the Lord Lyon in Edinburgh. In 1780 Cunninghame retired from the tobacco business.

== Family life ==
Cunninghame married three times and had fourteen children. He disinherited his eldest sons Thomas and Alexander and it was his third son William Cunninghame who eventually inherited the estate in 1799.

== Legacy ==
Today Cunninghame's neo classical palace on Glasgow's Queen Street houses the collection of the Gallery of Modern Art.

== See also ==
- John Glassford
