= Hattie Ellis =

Hattie Ellis is a British food writer and journalist.

Ellis trained as a journalist with Westminster Press and as a cook at Leith's Cookery School. She was a reporter on the Bath Evening Chronicle, a researcher for the BBC's Food and Drink programme, an associate producer for Hugh Fearnley-Whittingstall's A Cook on the Wild Side, Escape to River Cottage and TV Dinners and also worked on Dorinda Hafner's Tastes of Britain. She has appeared on Breakfast Time, Woman's Hour and The Food Programme.

== Books ==
- Spoonfuls of Honey: A Complete Guide to Honey's Flavours & Culinary Uses (2014) Pub. Pavilion Books ISBN 9781909108295
- Spoonfuls of Honey: Recipes from around the world (2020) Pub. Pavilion ISBN 9781911624707
- What to Eat?: 10 Chewy Questions About Food (2013) Pub. Granta Books ISBN 9781846272165
- Planet Chicken: The Shameful Story of the Bird on your Plate (2007) Pub. Holder and Stoughton ISBN 9780340921876
- Sweetness & Light: The Mysterious History of the Honeybee (2006) Pub. Crown ISBN 9781400054060
- Best of British Fish with Camilla Sacchi ISBN 9780753716915
- A Passion for Tea (2006) Pub. Ryland Peters and Small ISBN 9781845972288
- A Passion for Coffee (2006) Pub. Ryland Peters and Small ISBN 9781845972301
- Eating England: Why We Eat What We Eat (2001) Pub. Mitchell Beasley ISBN 9781840003512
- Trading Places: Europe's Finest Specialist Shops (1999) Pub. Mitchell Beasley ISBN 9781840002560
- Mood Food: Strategies for contemporary cooking and entertaining (1998) Pub. Headline ISBN 9780747221647
- Tea: Discovering, Exploring, Enjoying (2002) Pub. Ryland Peters and Small ISBN 9781841723518
- The one pot cook : 150 recipes for feeding family & friends (2015) Pub. Head of Zeus ISBN 9781781851265

== Other writing ==
- Kew's Teas, Tonics and Tipples: Inspiring Botanical Drinks to Excite Your Tastebuds (2016) Pub. Royal Botanic Gardens ISBN 9781842465882 - contributor
- Weill, Valerie London in Store (2005) Pub. Thames and Hudson ISBN 9780500512555 - preface
- Samuelson, M. K. Sussex Recipe Book: With a Few Excursions into Kent (2005 reprint) Pub. Southover Press ISBN 9781870962216 - introduction

Ellis has also written for the BBC, The Independent on Sunday and The Times.

== Awards and nominations ==
- 2001 Eating England won Special Award of the Jury, Gourmand World Cookbooks Award (English section)
- 2006 Best of British Fish - won Guild of Food Writer's Award for 'Work on British Food'
- 2013 What to Eat? - won Food Book of the Year
- 2013 Spoonfuls of Honey - shortlisted for the Andre Simon food writing awards
