= William Cuninghame of Lainshaw =

Scottish landowner

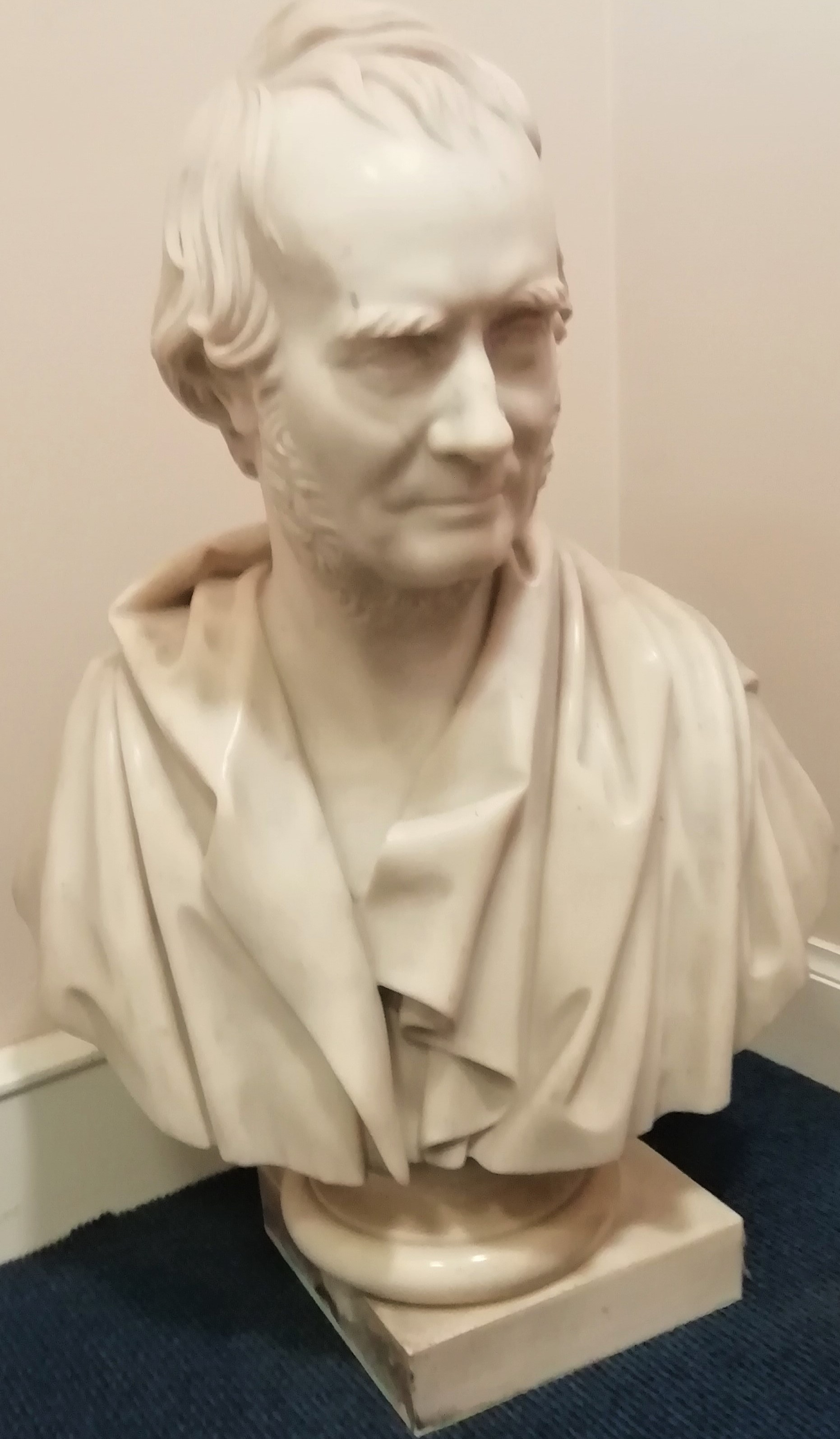
Marble bust of William Cunninghame.

William Cuninghame of Lainshaw (c.1775–1849) was a Scottish landowner, known as a writer on biblical prophecy. He dated the beginning of the reign of Antichrist to 533 A.D., to coincide with a claimed date at which Justinian I gave universal rule to the Papacy, by subtracting 1260 years from the date after the French Revolution at which it was seen to turn against the Roman Catholic Church.

== Life ==
He was the son of William Cunninghame (died 1804), a prosperous tobacco merchant of Glasgow, who in 1779 bought the Lainshaw estate, Stewarton, Ayrshire. Educated at the University of Utrecht, he joined the Bengal civil service of the East India Company. While in India he was influenced by William Carey the Baptist missionary. He returned to Scotland in 1804.

Cuninghame was one of a group of British biblical interpreters of the early 19th century, including also Edward Bickersteth, Thomas Rawson Birks, Joshua William Brooks, and Edward Bishop Elliott, who combined premillennialism with a more traditional historicist reading of prophecy. In this, he followed the earlier influence of Johann Heinrich Alsted in Diatribe mille annis apocalypticis (Frankfurt, 1627), and Joseph Mede in Clavis Apocalypticae. Departing from that traditional historicist hermeneutic, the premillennialism movement came to include futurist and dispensational contributors such as Hugh M'Neile, Edward Irving and John Nelson Darby.

From 1827 Cuninghame served as minister in a congregational church at Stewarton in Ayrshire. In 1839, under pressure from the presbytery of Irvine of the Church of Scotland, he began the "Stewarton case". It led rather directly to the Disruption of 1843.

== Works ==
Signature on vellum

- Remarks upon David Levi's Dissertations on the Prophecies relative to the Messiah, and upon the evidences of the divine character of Jesus Christ ... By an Inquirer calling himself, Talib (1810, anonymous)
- A Dissertation on the Seals and Trumpets of the Apocalypse (1813, 1817, 1832)
- A Letter to the London Society for Promoting Christianity amongst the Jews (1814)
- The Apostasy of the Church of Rome, and the Identity of the Papal Power: with the Man of Sin and son of perdition of St. Paul's prophecy, in the second epistle to the Thessalonians (1818)
- Letters and Essays, Controversial and Critical, on Subjects Connected with the Conversion and National Restoration of Israel. First Published in the Jewish Expositor (1822) A basic principle of Cuninghame's writings was a Jewish restoration in Palestine. He argued that the returned Messiah would reign at Jerusalem, over restored Jews.
- The Scheme of Prophetic Arrangement of the Rev. Edward Irving and Mr. Frere Critically Examined; with Some Remarks on the Present Aspect of Affairs in Reference to the Fulfilment of Prophecy (1826)
- Strictures on Certain Leading Positions and Interpretations of the Rev. Edward Irving's Lectures on the Apocalypse (1827, 1831)
- A Summary View of the Scriptural Argument for the Second and Glorious Advent of Messiah Before the Millenium (1828)
- The Doctrine of the Millennial Advent and Reign of Messiah, Vindicated from the Objections of the Edinburgh Theological Magazine ... With an Appendix, Containing Remarks on Dr. Hamilton's Recent Work on Millenarianism (1828). Against William Hamilton of Strathblane.
- A Critical Examination of some of the Fundamental Principles of the Rev. George Stanley Faber's Sacred Calendar of Prophecy (1829)
- Strictures on Mr. Maitland's four Pamphlets, Vindicating the Protestant Application of Prophecy to the Papacy (1832). Against Samuel Roffey Maitland.
- The Pre-millenial Advent of Messiah Demonstrated from the Scriptures: Especially Addressed to the Consideration of the Ministers of Christ (1833)
- A Review of the Rev. Dr. Wardlaw's Sermon on the Millennium (1833). Reply to Ralph Wardlaw.
- On the Jubilean Chronology of the Seventh Trumpet of the Apocalypse, and the Judgment of the Ancient of Days, Daniel VII. (1834)
- A Letter to the Editor of the Investigator; being Strictures on his Review of the Jubilean Chronology in the Investigator for May 1834, and on the Arguments of Maramensis, in the same number, palliating the idolatory and the abominations of Rome papal (1834). To Joshua William Brooks.
- The Chronology of Israel and the Jews from the Exodus to the Destruction of Jerusalem by the Romans (1835)
- A Synopsis of Chronology from the Era of Creation ... to ... 1837 (1837)
- The Septuagint and Hebrew Chronologies tried by the Test of their Internal Scientific Evidence (1838)
- The Doctrine of the Millennial Advent and Reign of Messiah: Vindicated from the Objections of the Edinburgh Theological Magazine in a Letter to the Editor of that Magazine (1838)
- The Fulness of the Times: being an analysis of the chronology of the seventy (1839)
- The Scientific Chronology of the Year 1839 (1839)
- A Supplement to the Scientific Chronology of the Year 1839 (1840)
- The Season of the End: Being a View of the Scientific Times of the Year 1840 (Computed As Ending on the 30th Adar, March 23d, 1841) (1841)
- The Political Destiny of the Earth, as revealed in the Bible (1842)
- A Chart of Sacred Chronology: Showing the Greek and Hebrew Chronologies (1843)
- The Fulfilling of the Times of the Gentiles, a Conspicuous Sign of the End (1847)
- The Angel with the Measuring Line to Measure Jerusalem: Zechariah II. 1, and the Times of the Vision: a Chronological Tract (1848)
- The Certain Truth, the Science, and the Authority of the Scriptural Chronology (1849)
- A Letter ... on the Necessity of Immediate Measures for the Jewish Colonization of Palestine (1849)
