= Scottish sundial =

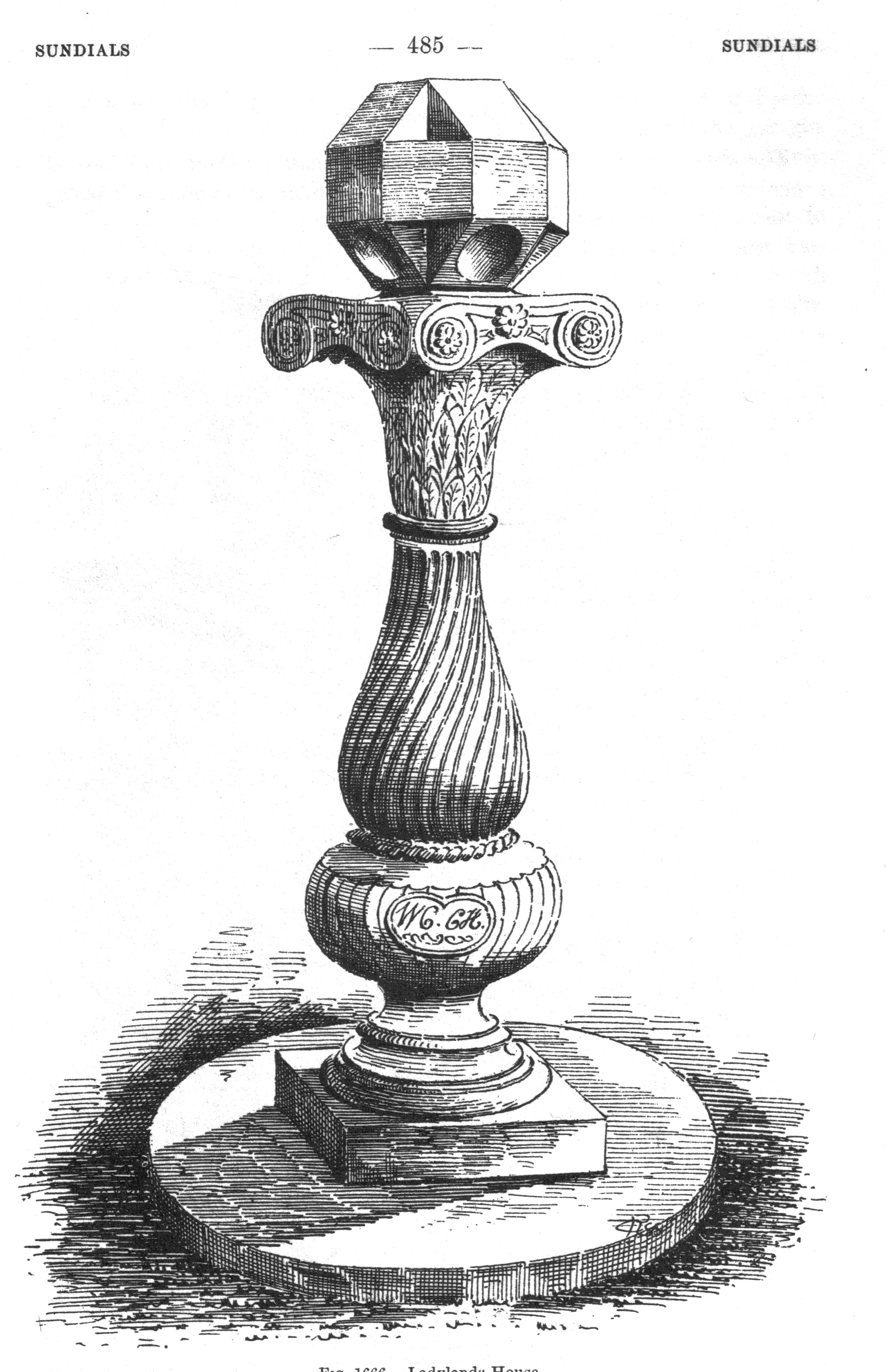
The 1821 sundial inscribed to William Cochran and his wife Catherine Hamilton at Ladyland in Ayrshire.

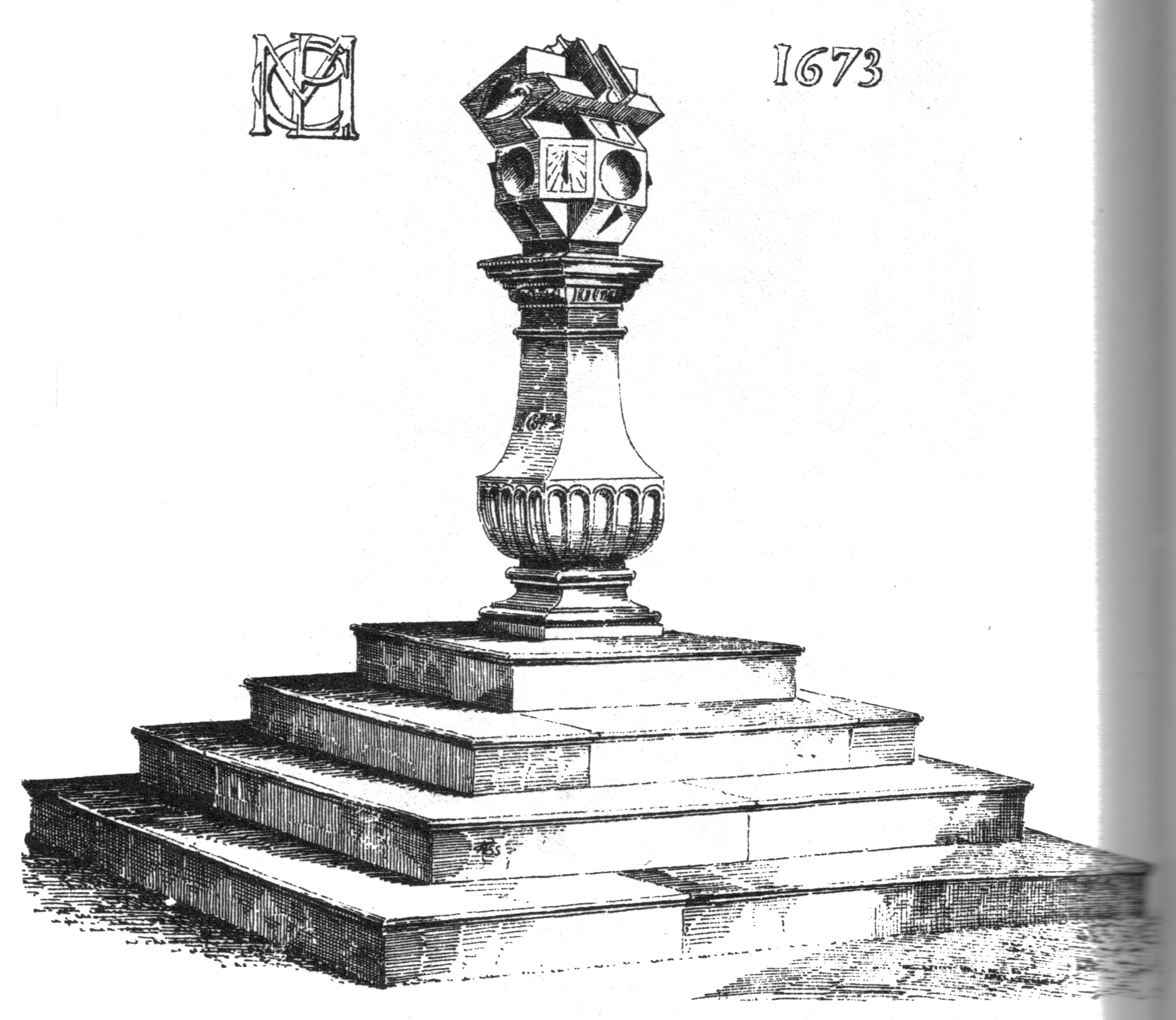
The 1673 Ladyland lectern-style sundial.

Scottish sundials of the renaissance period are not just more numerous than in any other country—they are also stylistically unique. This is particularly notable when the size and wealth of Scotland at the time are taken into account. They are free standing stone sculptures of the 17th and 18th centuries with many small dials inscribed on them. Accurate time telling is clearly not the aim. Precision is sacrificed for decorative effect. Unlike the sundials of similar date on the continent where baroque decoration may be added, the mathematical complexity of the Scottish dials is decoration enough. The ancient sundials of Scotland can be grouped into three main styles: lectern, obelisk and facet-head.

== Lectern dials ==
These are noticeable for their sloping top like a reading desk or lectern, in the equatorial plane, usually with a star on top having dials in all its angles, and at 90 degrees to this a hemi-cylinder with a polar dial inscribed in it. The lectern usually has hollow dials on the south, east and west faces, and hour lines are inscribed in every available angle.

One of the more complicated was formerly at Mid Calder House and is now at Culzean Castle.

Lectern dials have some counterparts in continental Europe. This is particularly true of the Netherlands which was Scotland's primary trading partner of the time and where several lectern dials survive.

== Obelisk dials ==
Obelisk dials are unique to Scotland and there are only 26 of them known. The first is meant to be that at Drummond Castle. It was carved in 1630 by John Mylne the King's Master Mason.

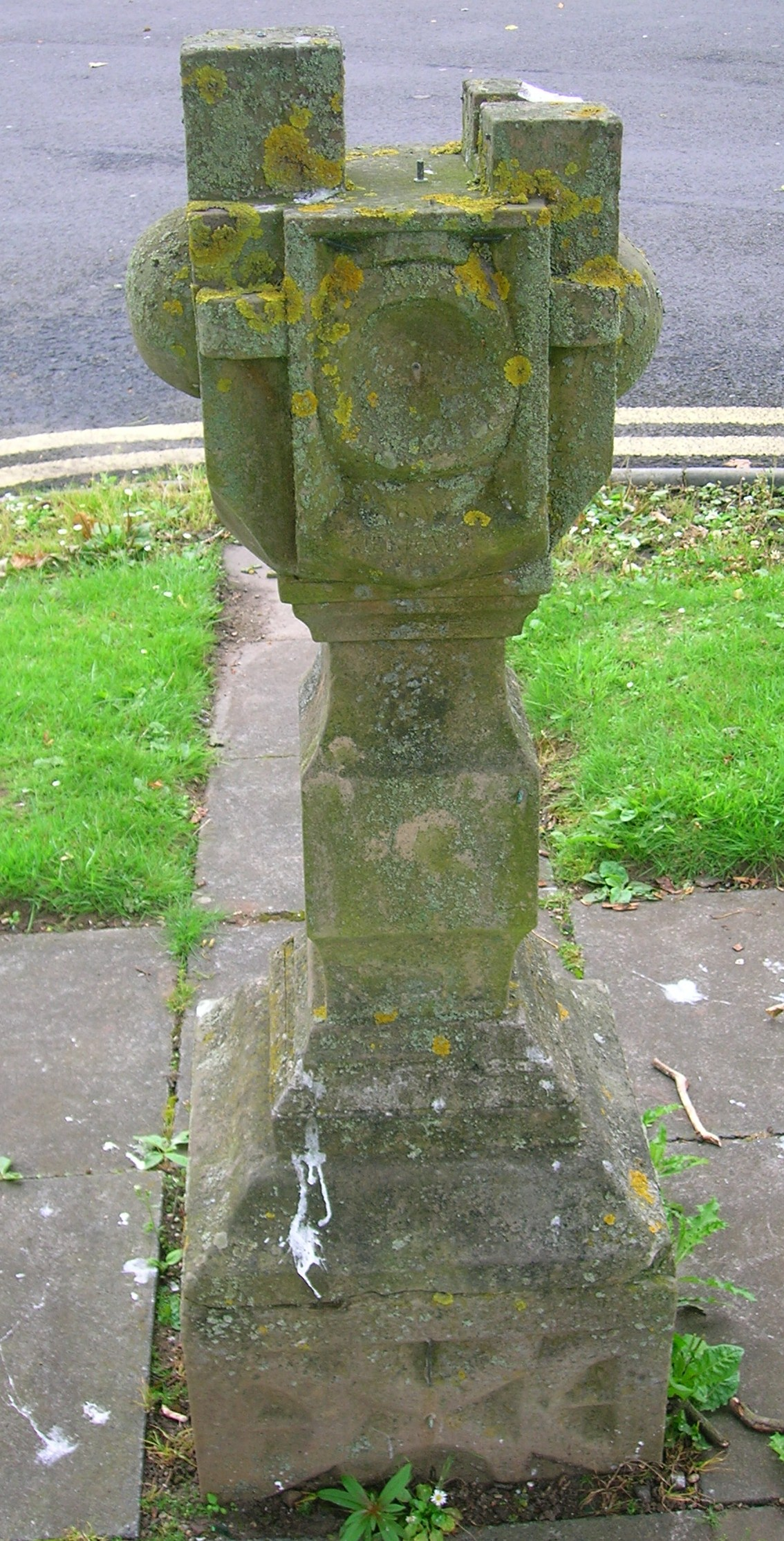
The Kirkhall composite sundial at Ardrossan

Obelisk dials are made up of three parts. The base element is a square shaft with four or five square panels on each side. In these panels are often sunken dials of bowl-hollows, hearts or triangular and rectangular shapes. The middle element is an octagonal section boss. The corners may be cut away and have dials inscribed in the hollows. The crowning element is a square tapering finial which when viewed with the lower square shaft produces the obelisk appearance. This finial also has panelled sides with up to seven or eight on each side. There can be 70 or 80 surfaces in total available for dials.

== Facet-head dials ==
This term includes a wide variety of other types ranging from a simple cube to complex polyhedrals. The most dramatic of these is at Glamis Castle.

== Bibliography ==
The information here is heavily derived from the writings of Andrew Somerville who in turn used the pioneering Victorian writings of Thomas Ross.

- Vol. 5 The Castellated and Domestic Architecture of Scotland, MacGibbon & Ross (1892)
- The Ancient Sundials of Scotland, Andrew R Somerville (1990)
