= Barony of Ladyland =

Former barony in North Ayrshire, Scotland

Coordinates: 55.785°N 4.678°W

The Barony of Ladyland was in the old feudal Baillerie of Cunninghame, near Kilbirnie in what is now North Ayrshire, Scotland.

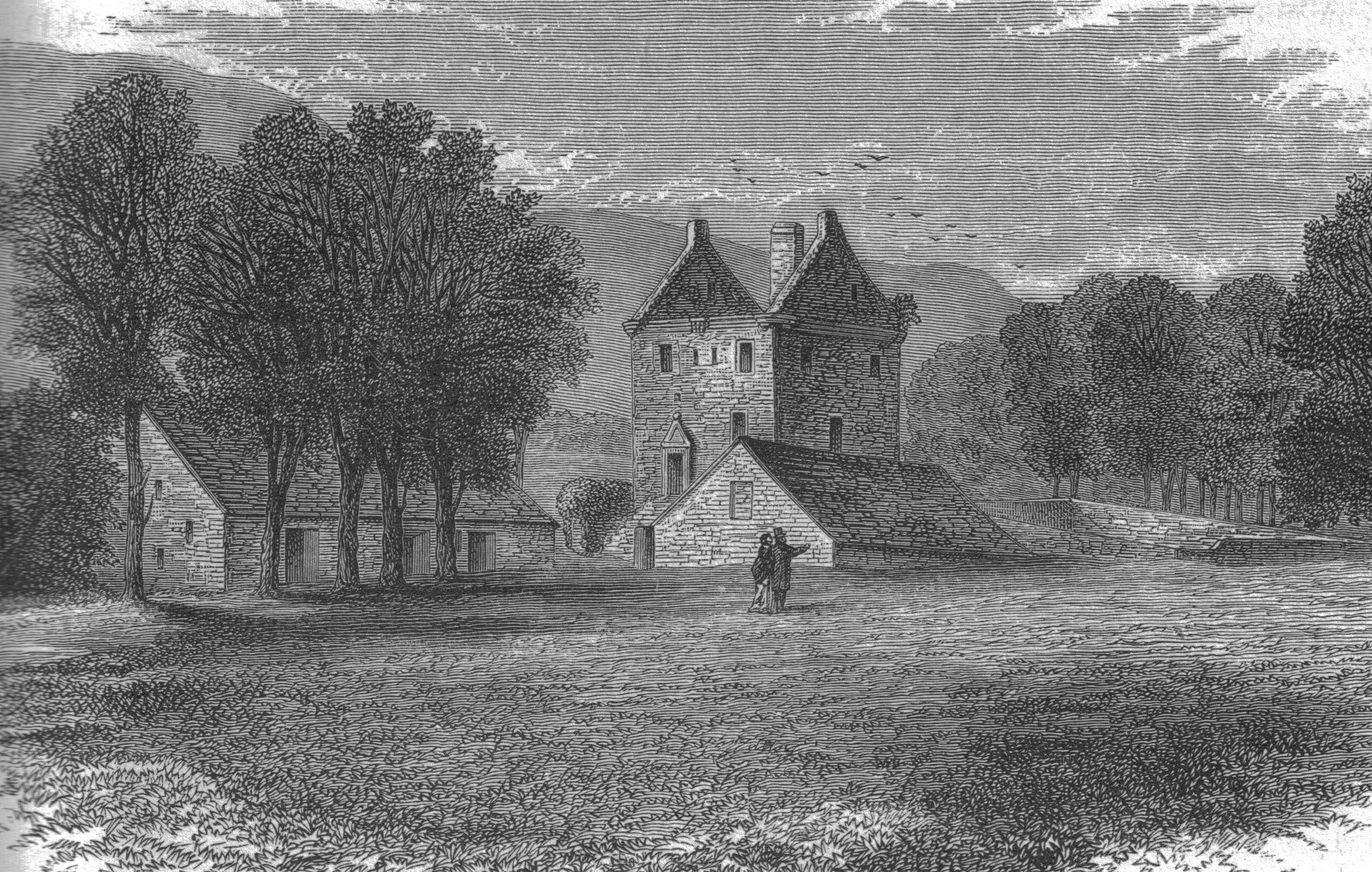
Ladyland Castle in the 1820s

== The history of the Barony of Ladyland ==
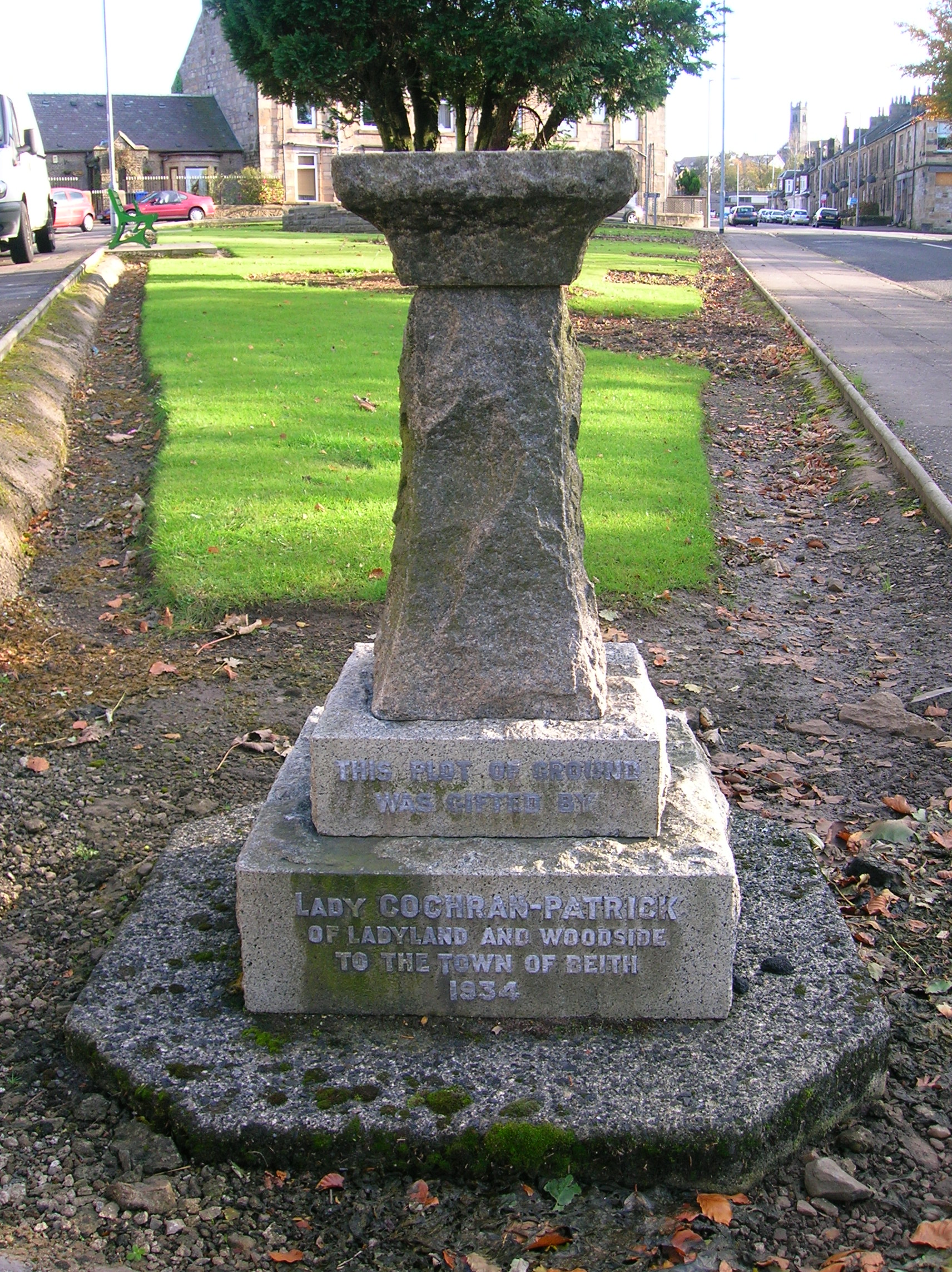
A sundial recording the donation of the Beith War Memorial plot by Lady Cochran-Patrick of Ladyland and Mosside.

In the Parish of Kilbirnie were three baronies, Kilbirnie, Glengarnock and Ladyland. The first Lairds of Ladyland were a cadet branch of the Barclays of Kilbirnie. Archibald, as second son, is recorded as having the Barony of Ladyland bestowed upon him by his father, Sir Hugh Barclay. David Barclay of Ladyland was with Mary, Queen of Scots, at Hamilton in May 1568 and probably fought at the Battle of Langside where the Queen's side lost and she subsequently fled the realm.

Hugh (Hew) Barclay of Ladyland was a poet of considerable power and humour and a fervent papist, married to Isobel Stewart, meeting an unusual death by drowning on Ailsa Craig. Sir David Barclay of Ladyland and Auchinheiff (now 'Auchenhove') succeeded his brother Hugh and married Elizabeth Cunningham, the widow of John Craufurd of Craufurdland who had died in 1612, aged only 21, from an injury received at football. His son, also David, was unfortunate enough to inherit his father's debts and was forced to sell Ladyland to John Blair of Cloberhill in full payment. This was the end of the Barclay's involvement in the barony and by 1654 Sir David Cuninghame was the Laird of Ladyland, a property then valued at £546 17s 8d.

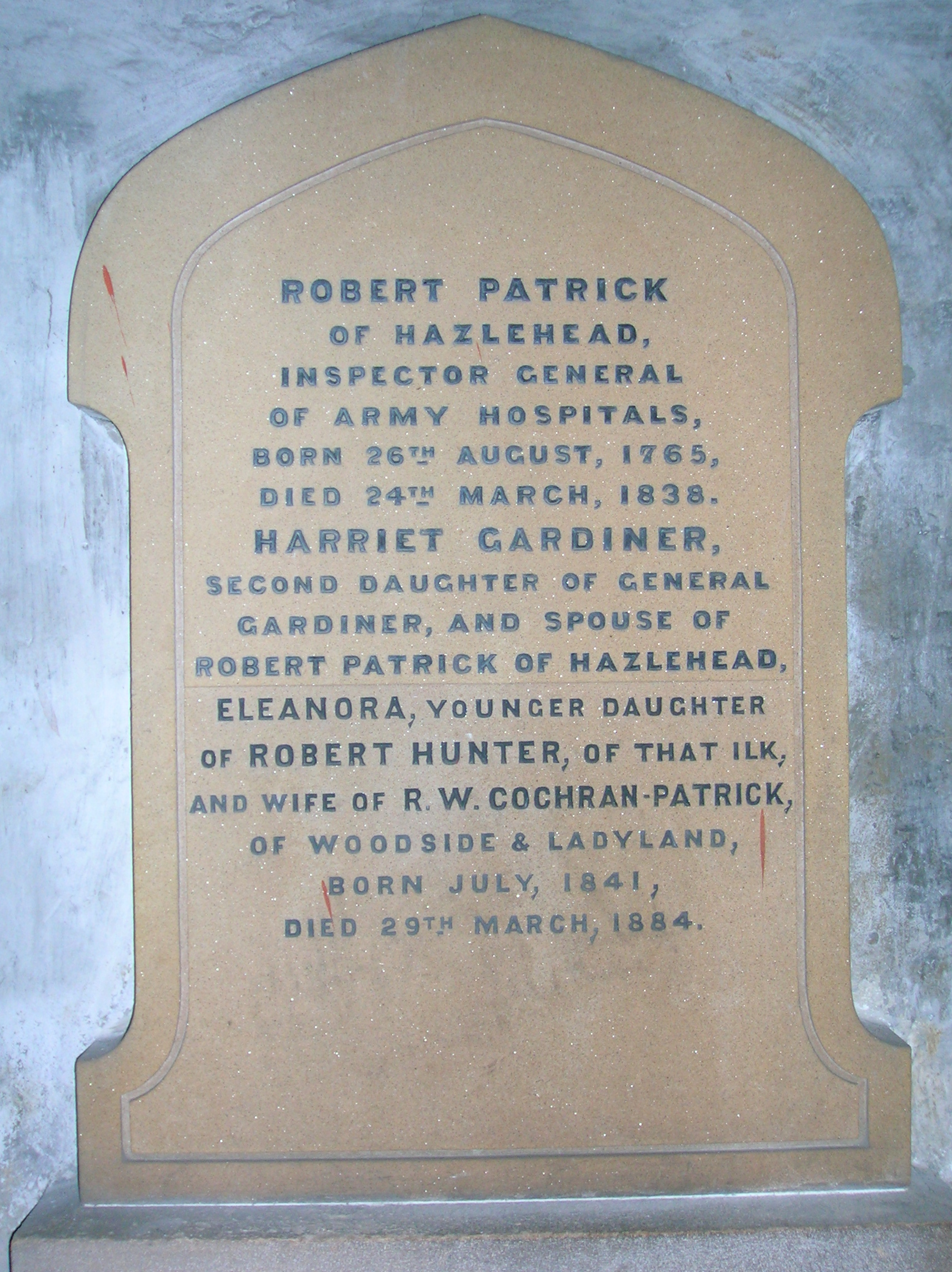
Memorial stone of Eleanora Patrick, wife of R. W. Cochran-Patrick of Woodside and Ladyland in Beith Auld Kirk.

Captain William Hamilton of Ardoch or Airdoch in Kilwinning Parish was the first of the Hamiltons of Ladyland (see illustration of their Coat of Arms). Lieutenant William Hamilton of Gilbertfield in Lanarkshire still owned Ladyland, but rented Gilbertfield, where he lived, making only the occasional visit to Ladyland. William was a published poet and a friend and correspondent of the poet Allan Ramsay. In 1722, Hamilton published an abridged and modernised version of Blind Harry's Wallace, which, though an artistic failure, aroused Robert Burns's boyhood interest and enthusiasm and, as he recorded in the Autobiographical Letter: 'poured a Scottish prejudice in my veins which will boil along there till the flood gates of life shut in eternal rest.'

John Hamilton, 8th of Ardoch, 2nd of Ladyland, sold Ardoch and Ladyland c1712 and purchased Ballybregach in Northern Ireland and renamed it Ladyland. Hamilton's became well established in Ireland and the name Ladyland still exists. John Hamilton sold Ladyland to an Ensign Henry Moncrieff, Collector of Cess for Renfrewshire; Moncrieff than sold the property to Alexander, 9th Earl of Eglinton.

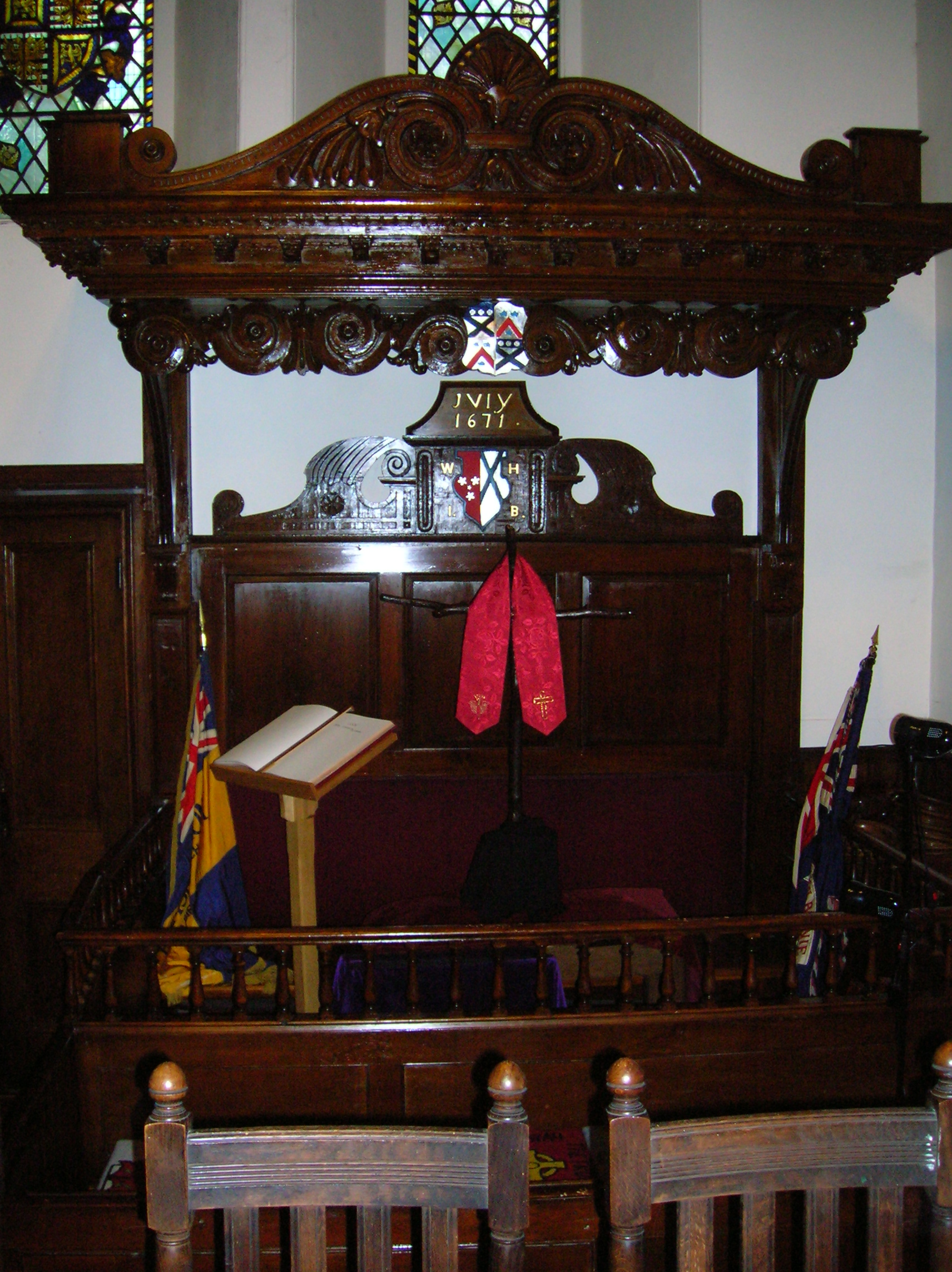
The Ladyland Loft in Kilbirnie Auld Kirk.

William Cochran of Edge purchased Ladyland in around 1718 from the Earl of Eglinton and lived there with his wife Margaret Orr of Easter Gavin. They had a son and five daughters; William succeeding in 1756 and marrying Janet Glasgow of Pudevenholme, part of the Glengarnock estate. In 1803 their son William succeeded and married Catherine Hamilton on 5 September 1815. Catherine was a distant relation of the Hamiltons of Ladyland. They had two daughters, Agnes and Janet Glasgow Cochran; the eldest inherited upon his death in 1832; she had married William Charles Richard Patrick in April 1832. Agnes's husband, an advocate, was the second son of Dr. Robert Patrick of Trearne and Hessilhead and he took his wife's name to establish the Cochran-Patrick line.

Robert William Cochran-Patrick (1842–1897) was Dean of Faculties at Glasgow University, 1882 to 1885 and was awarded an honorary LLD by the University in 1879. Robert was born at Ladyland and studied at the University of Edinburgh and Trinity Hall, Cambridge. He returned to Ayrshire to live the life of a country gentleman and study archaeology, becoming a Fellow of the Society of Antiquaries of Scotland and of the Society of Antiquaries of London, and in 1874 he was one of the founders of the Ayrshire and Wigtownshire Archaeological Association. Robert was best known as a numismatist and he assembled one of the country's greatest collections of early Scottish coins and medals. He wrote the two volumes of 'Records of the Coinage of Scottish.' Cochran-Patrick was Conservative MP for North Ayrshire, 1880 to 1885. He was a president of the Irvine Burns Club and also the Chairman of the Governors of the Spier's school at Beith and Provincial Grand Master of the Masons of Ayrshire. Mrs Cochran-Patrick, wife of R. W Cochran-Patrick, was the younger daughter of Mr. Hunter of Hunterston Castle. In 1969 the Lyon Court officially recognised Neil Kennedy-Cochran-Patrick (b. 1926) in the name of the Hunter of Hunterston as being 29th Laird of Hunterston and Chief of Clan Hunter.

== Barclay, Montgomerie and Ailsa Craig ==
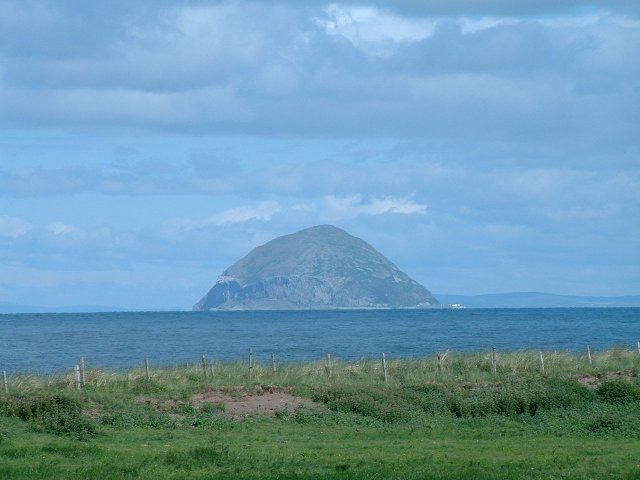
Ailsa Craig.

As stated Hugh or Hew Barclay of Ladyland was a Roman Catholic and became involved in a plot in 1592 and upon discovery he was imprisoned in the Tolbooth in Edinburgh, but was released, by the King's directions, in 1593 following assurances of good conduct. Hugh again became involved in plotting, for which he was imprisoned for a time in the Castle of Glasgow, but escaped and fled to Spain where he was in communication with Jesuits.

In 1597 he returned and took possession, with several others, of Ailsa Craig. He was intent on using it as a provisioning and stopping off point for a Spanish invasion that would re-establish the Catholic faith in Scotland—a plot originally established by the Earls of Angus, Errol, and Huntly. He was discovered on Ailsa Craig by the Protestant Minister of Paisley, Andrew Knox, and upon being discovered and reflecting upon his previous assurances of good conduct, he either tried to escape and had an accidental death or he deliberately drowned himself in the sea off the island. He had been a close friend of Alexander Montgomerie of Hessilhead, the famous poet, to whom he had on one occasion addressed his own poetry. Metcalfe records that Knox actually reached Ailsa Craig first and Hugh drew his sword, found himself under determined attack and falling into the sea, drowned. Knox was charged with Hugh's death by his friends, however upon appeal to the King in Council, his actions were justified as loyal and good service done to His Majesty and country. The King forbade any to molest him, and charged all magistrates and others in office to assist in protecting him.

== The history of Ladyland castle ==
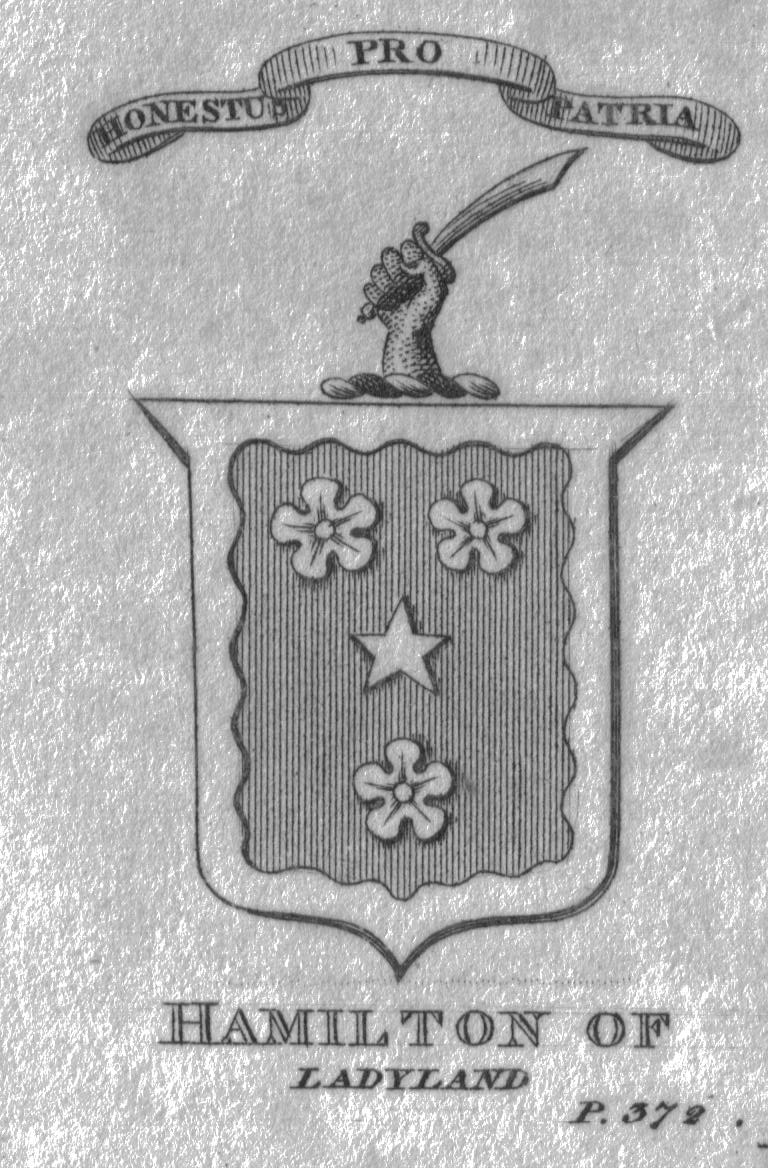
Coat of arms of the Hamiltons of Ladyland.

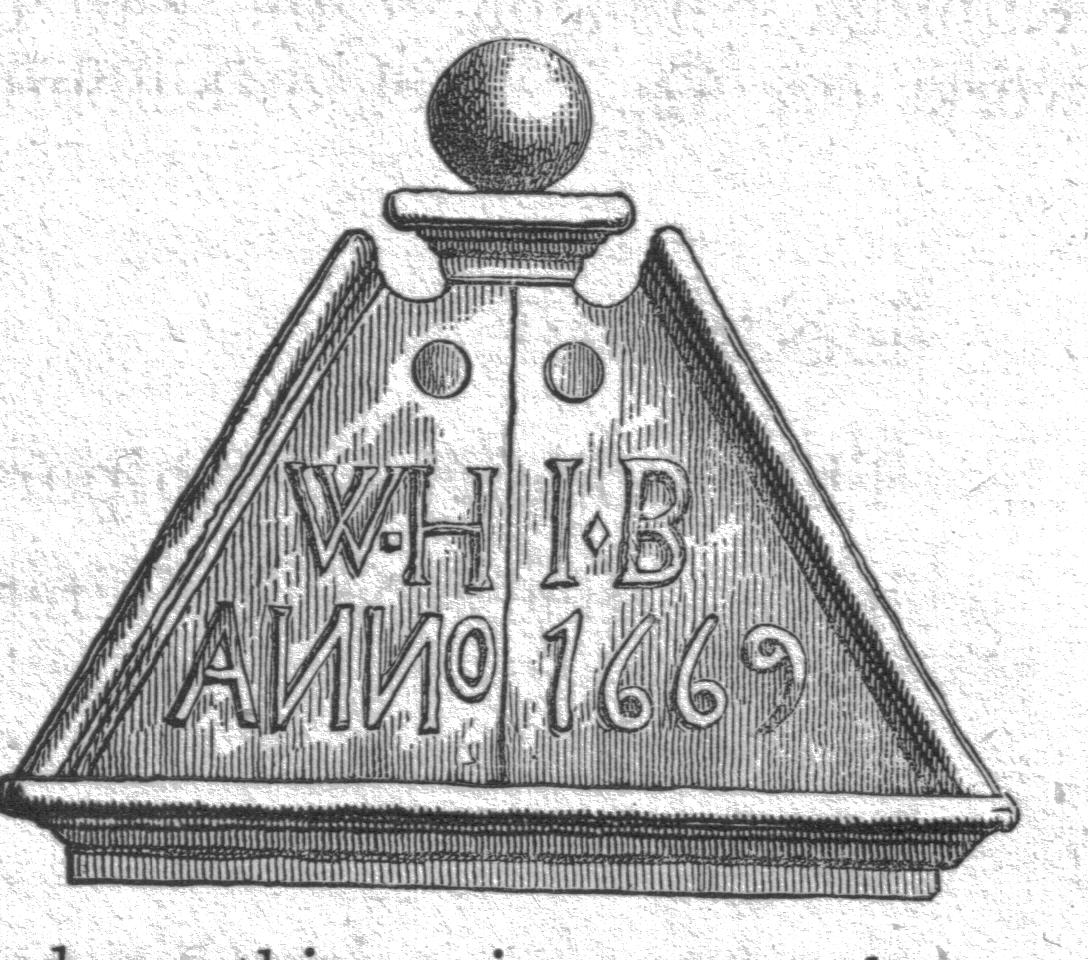
Pediment stone from a door or window of the old castle. It is inscribed W.H. I.B. with the date 1669.

Ladyland or Lady Land Castle (NS 3230 5791) was the caput of the Barony of Ladyland and was a typical tower house of the 16th century, probably with three storeys and a typical corbelled parapet around the roof; each corner originally having a small turret, later modified, probably in 1669, when a typical pitched roof was added and the building made more comfortable and less defensive for William Hamilton of Ardoch who obtained the property from the Earl of Eglinton. A more impressive door was created at the existing first floor level, a pediment above being inscribed with W.H. I.B. and dated 1669. This inscription refers to Hamilton and his Barclay bride. This pediment survives and is now above the gateway into the walled garden.

The castle had low buildings either side that looked a little like wings, and were probably for stables and storage. A sundial dated 1673 survives, and may have been built to commemorate the completion of the 'modernisation' works. In the walled garden, another stone, dated 1817, bears the inscription W.C. C.H..

Workers discovered a cavity in one of the walls when the castle was being partially demolished in 1815; this contained four small urns, a painted drinking glass and a large jaw bone, possibly of an ox. Two of the urns had handles and all were tightly closed with shreds or trimmings of woven cloth. One of the urns contained the breast and side bones of a chicken and the others a sort of greasy soil. A coin was found in the grounds near the old tower, bearing the legend 'FESTINA LENTE' ('Make Haste Slowly'); other details being too worn too make out. No explanation has been put forward for these articles presence here. A portion of the castle survives, about 20 feet long and 25 feet in height, forming the north elevation of the walled garden. It has an elliptical gun port in it and a rectangular window. Some square bee bole recesses are also present.

In 1691 the Hearth Tax records show that Ladyland had ten hearths and eighteen other dwellings were associated with the estate.

W. C. Patrick of Ladyland strengthened the walls of Glengarnock Castle in 1841 as recorded on a tablet attached to the building.

== Ladyland House and stables ==
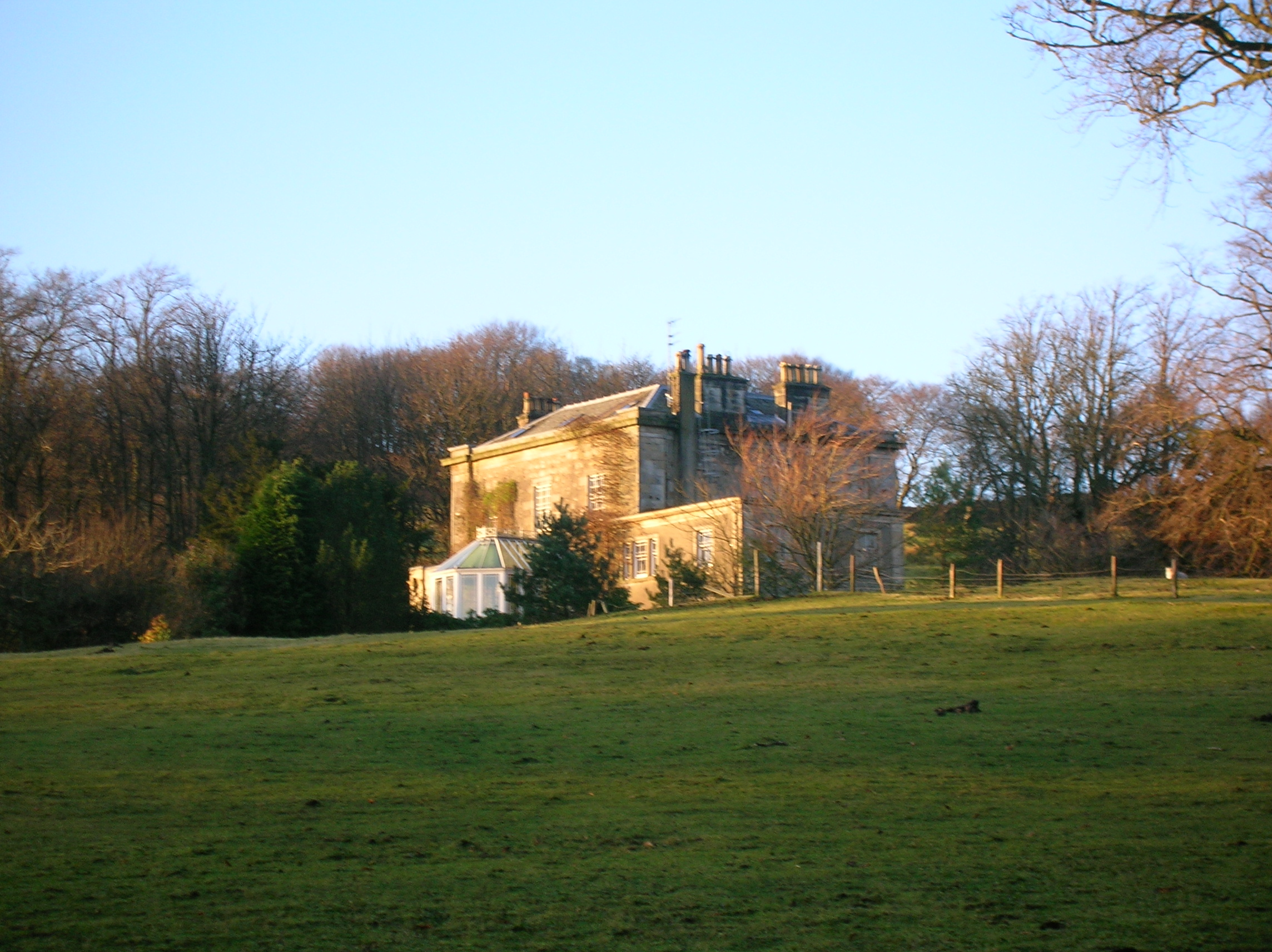
Ladyland House from the main driveway.

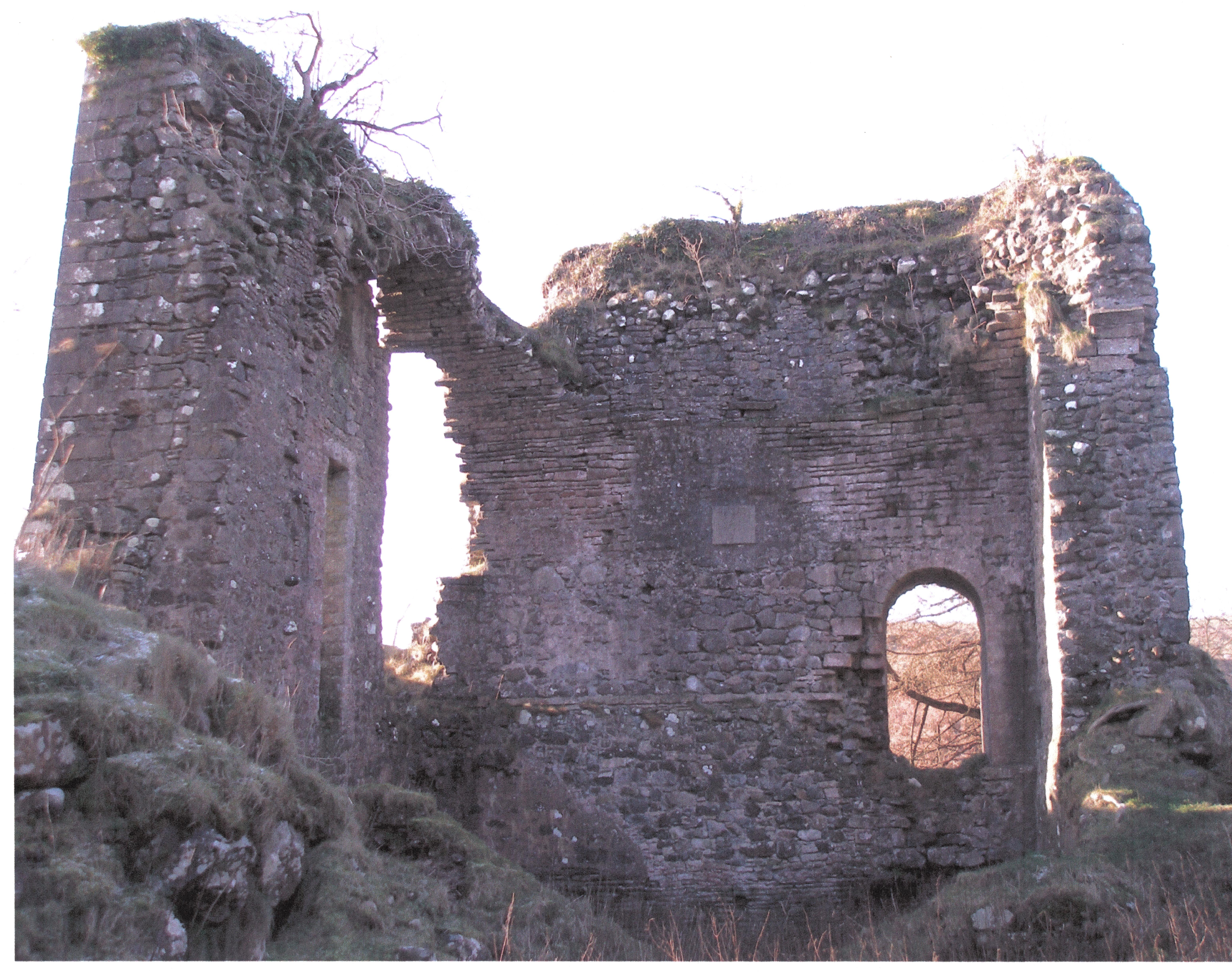
A view of Glengarnock Castle with the tablet recording repairs by Cochran of Ladyland.

Ladyland House is an A-listed building about two miles from Kilbirnie, and is one of David Hamilton's most picturesque country houses, designed for William Cochran. The large pilasters on each corner are a distinguishing feature for this architect and an interesting feature is the tartan-checked window-bar pattern and bold corner quoins. The nearby stables were designed by Brown & Wardrop Architects, most likely by Francis Drummond Greville Stanley in 1860 and 1861, who adopted a style similar to Hamilton. The stables have since been carefully converted into private dwellings; possibly incorporating original 17th-century building work in their wings. The house was built sometime between 1816–1821. In 1925 a wing designed to blend in with the original house was added by the architect James Houston of Kilbirnie. The house was purchased in 2017 by Dr. Kiril Sharapov and the landscape architect, Colin Burden.

=== The Ladyland sundials ===
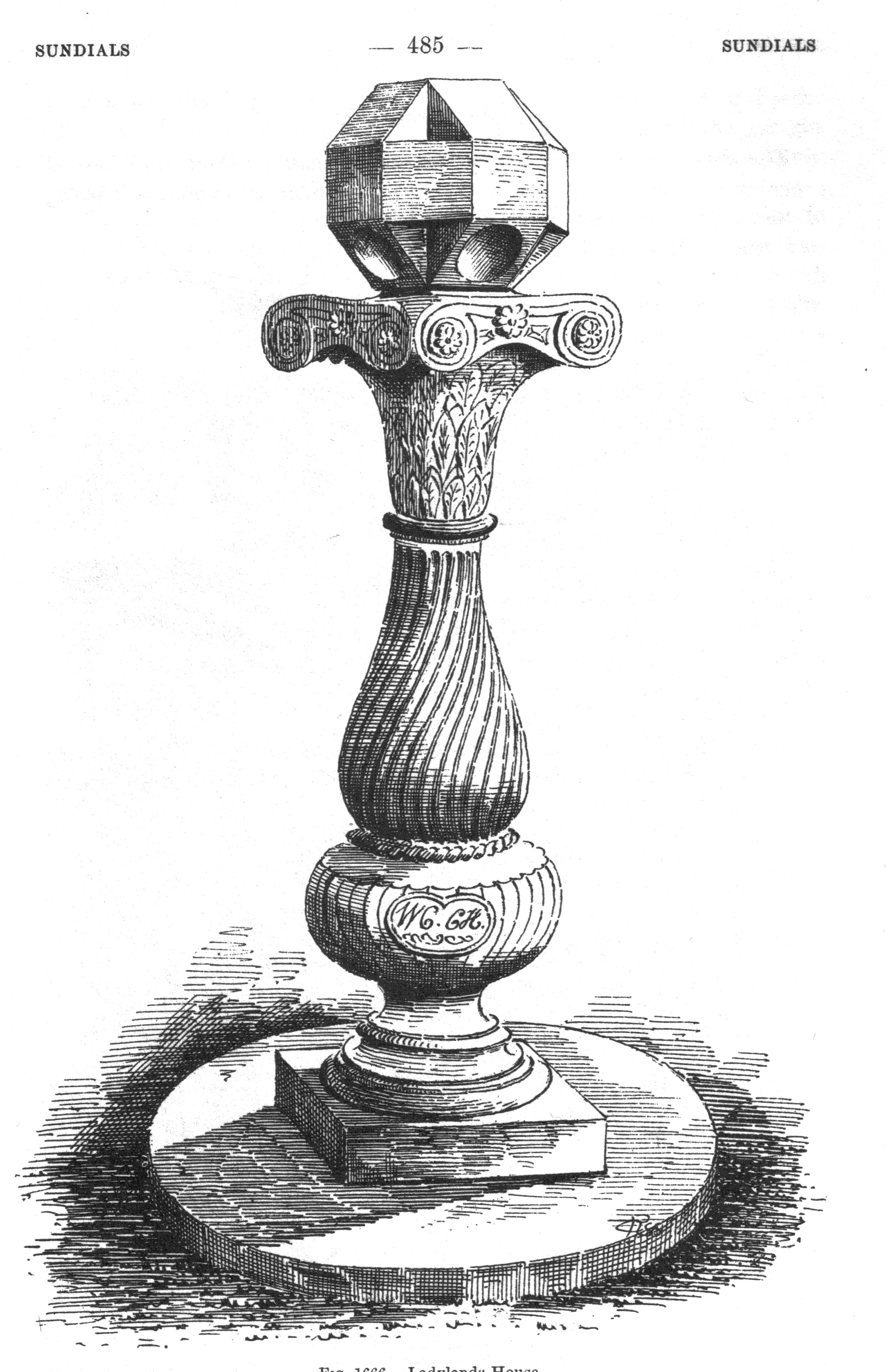
The 1821 sundial inscribed to William Cochran and his wife Catherine Hamilton.

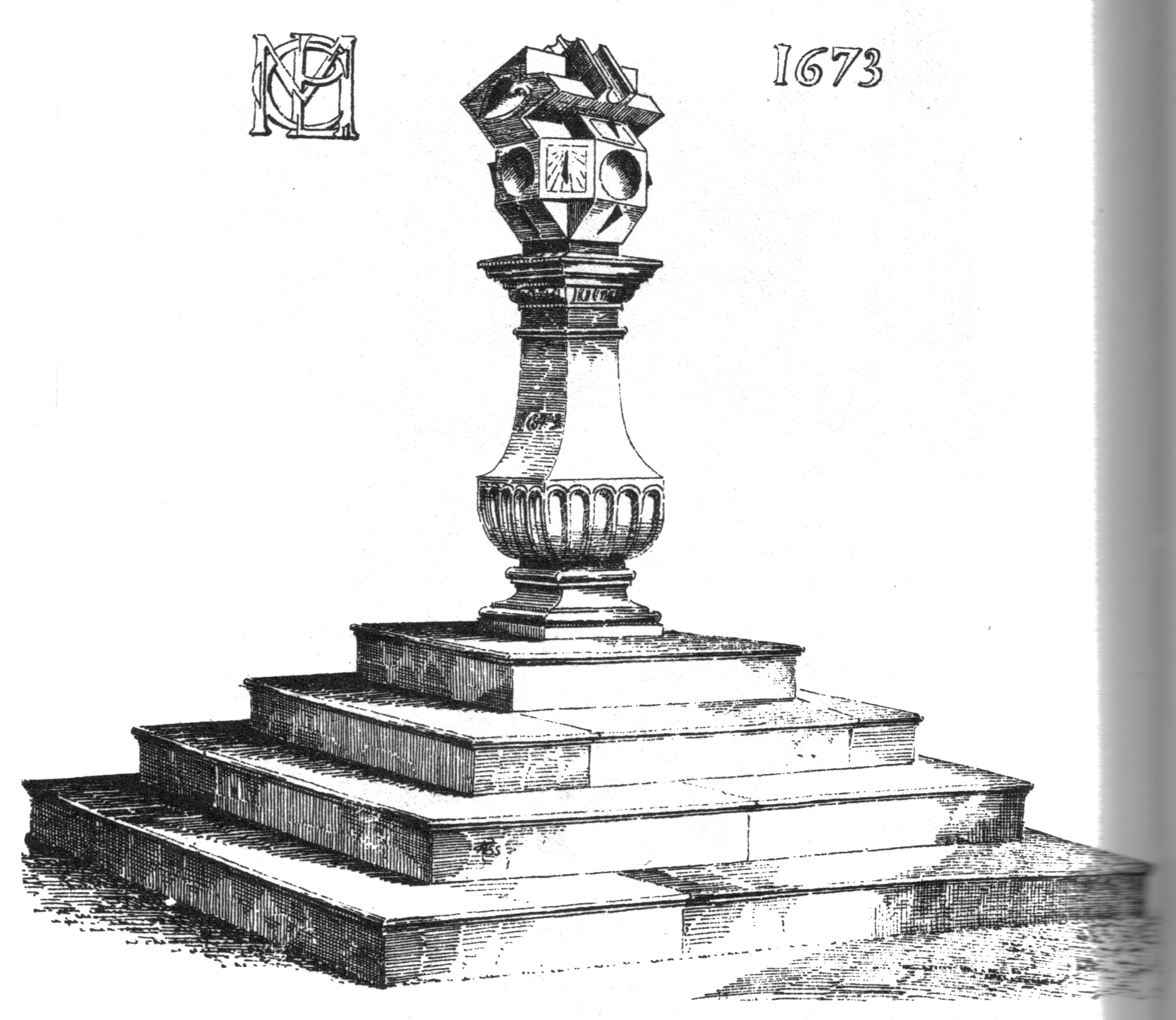
The 1673 Ladyland lectern-style sundial.

A Scottish sundial at the stables is dated 1821, and may commemorate the completion of building works, as with the fine example of a 1673 Scottish sundial—originally from the old castle—that now stands in front of the mansion house. The older sundial stands on a pedestal more like those usually found with horizontal dials, and bears the monogram M.P.C. The 1821 dial may not have originally been made for its current graceful and highly ornamented pedestal.

=== The policies and curtilage ===
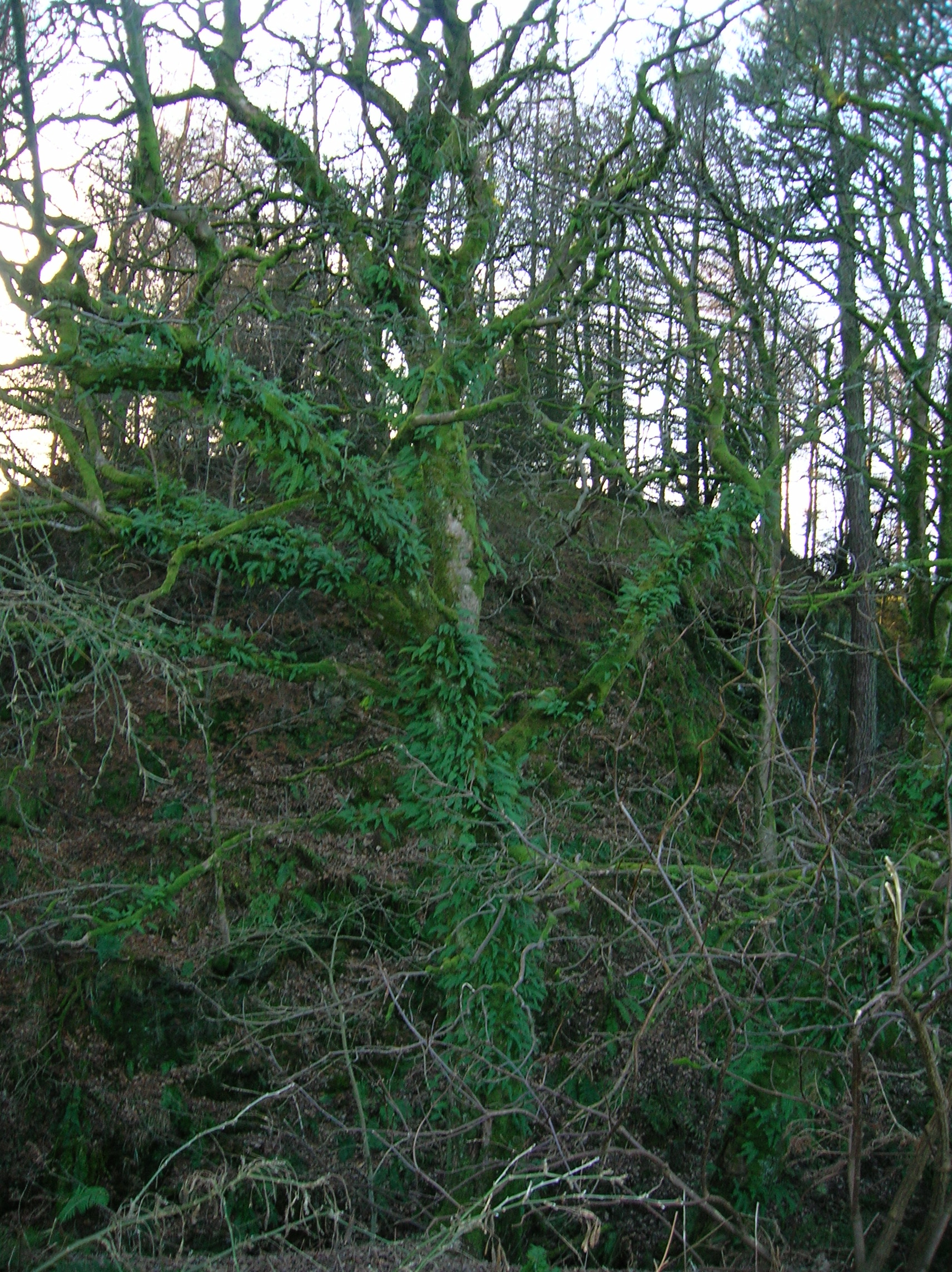
A Sycamore covered with epiphytic Common Polypody ferns growing in the Ladyland Glen.

The Ladyland Burn runs through the site, probably deriving its name from a typical pre-reformation chapel, long forgotten, such as those at Trearne, Blair House, Chapeltoun House, etc. The Maich Water rises from Mistylaw Muir and runs through an attractive Glen nearby with a small reservoir upstream created by Renfrew County Council of old. The Maich Water forms the Local Authority boundary here and harbours a geocache upon its course before it empties into Kilbirnie Loch. The Smuggler's Cave is on the side of the Maich Water, formerly reached through an entrance guarded by sandstone pillars off the driveway. An impressive main entrance off the road from Ford Cottage sets the stage for the rural and aristocratic nature of Ladyland. The 'Sheep Linn' is situated on the Maich Water above Cockston Farm.

=== Maich Water and Ladyland Moor ===
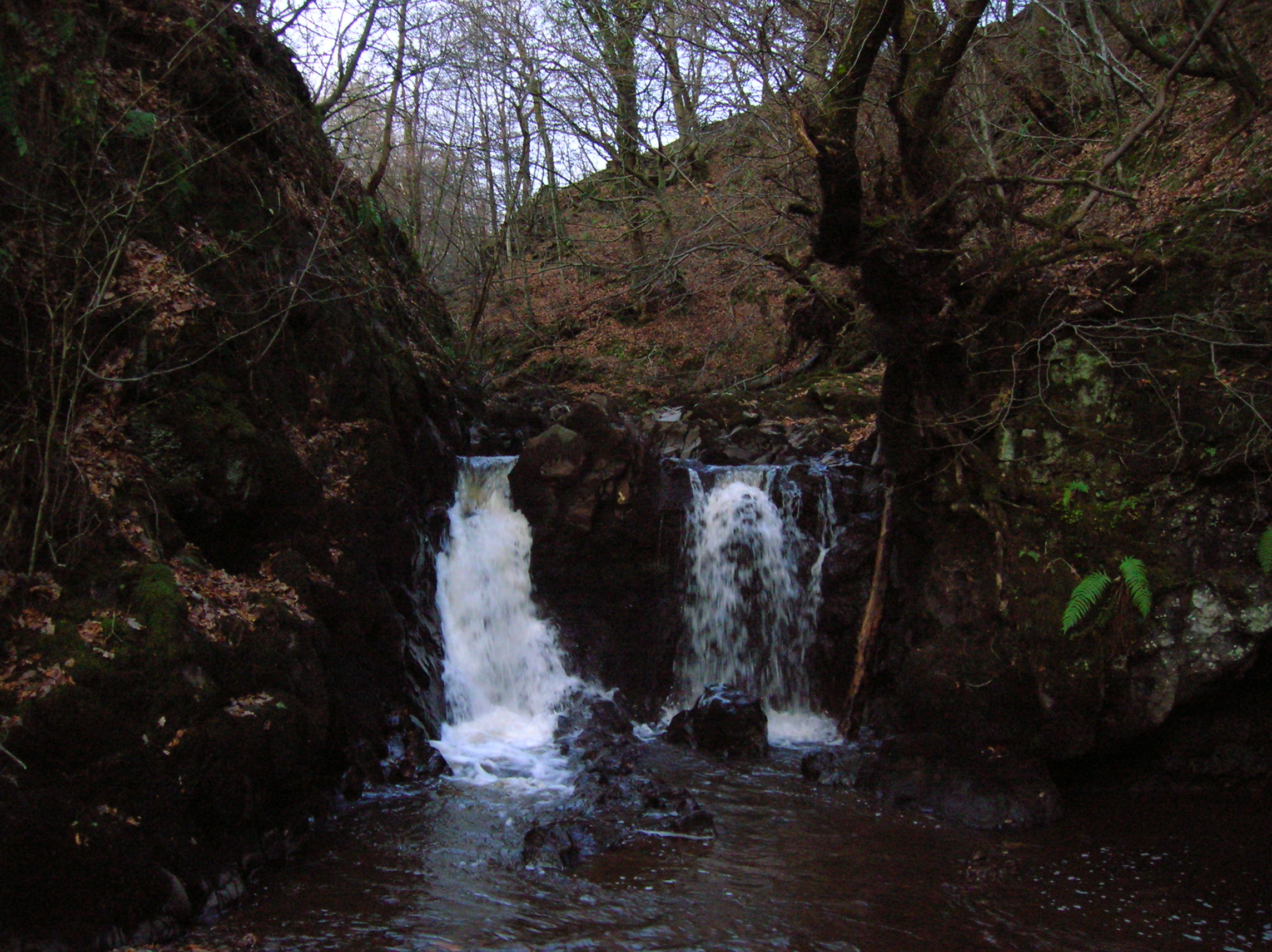
A waterfall on the Maich Water near Ladyland.

The Scottish Wildlife Trust have designated these areas as part of a Provisional Wildlife Site under the title 'Glengarnock and surrounding uplands'. The following plants are rare species found here — Whorled Caraway (Carum carvi), Fragrant Orchid (Gymnadenia conopsea), Aspen (Populus tremulans), Ivy-leaved Crowfoot (Ranunculus hederaceus L. ), Dovedale Moss or Mossy Saxifrage (Saxifraga hypnoides), Hairy Stonecrop (Sedum villosum), Wilson's Filmy Fern (Hymenophyllum wilsonii), Bay Willow (Salix pentandra), Beech Fern (Phegopteris connectilis), Oak Fern (Gymnocarpium dryopteris) and Mountain Pansy (Viola lutea).

=== The De'il's Chuckie Stane, the Cat Craig and archaeological finds ===
Near the Ladyland Burn beneath a copse of trees to the side of the mansion house is the 'De'il's Chuckie Stane' as indicated on old maps. It has survived being broken up and does not seem to be a glacial erratic, unlike many other obvious 'erratic' stones that have become linked to local folklore traditions. No surviving local legends have explained its evocative name. Chuckie's are pebbles, often made of quartz, a white stone, which this stone is not. Its significance most likely links with an emphasis on the implied giant stature of the De'il if this is his 'chuckie stane'.

The Cat Craig is located beside the lane running up to Cockston farm and is one of two drystone wall enclosed crags. The name 'Cat' is applied to many stones, such as the 'Cat Stone' on the Isle of Arran near the village of Corrie and the Cat Stane near Edinburgh Airport. 'Cat' is thought to come from 'Cath', a Celtic word, meaning a 'battle.' The Norwegian term, 'Bauta Stein', means the same thing. The first edition of the OS 6 inch maps shows a 'Castle Hill' in line with Cockston Farm on the other side of the Maich Water and this may make the meaning of the name 'Cat Craig' more plausible. Cockston Farm and sheep fauld date from at least 1827.

About 1810, Mr. Cochran of Ladyland removed a stone cairn near Ladyland above the Ford farmhouse during agricultural improvements; an urn with burnt bones was found in the centre of it. At Ladyland itself a small bronze axe was dug up. It measures 5 3/8 inches by 3 inches wide. This axe is a Coles' type I, found at NS 322 578; it was donated to the National Museum of Antiquities of Scotland (NMAS) in 1886 by R W Cochran-Patrick (Accession no: DC 53). It has slight flanges and a stop ridge.

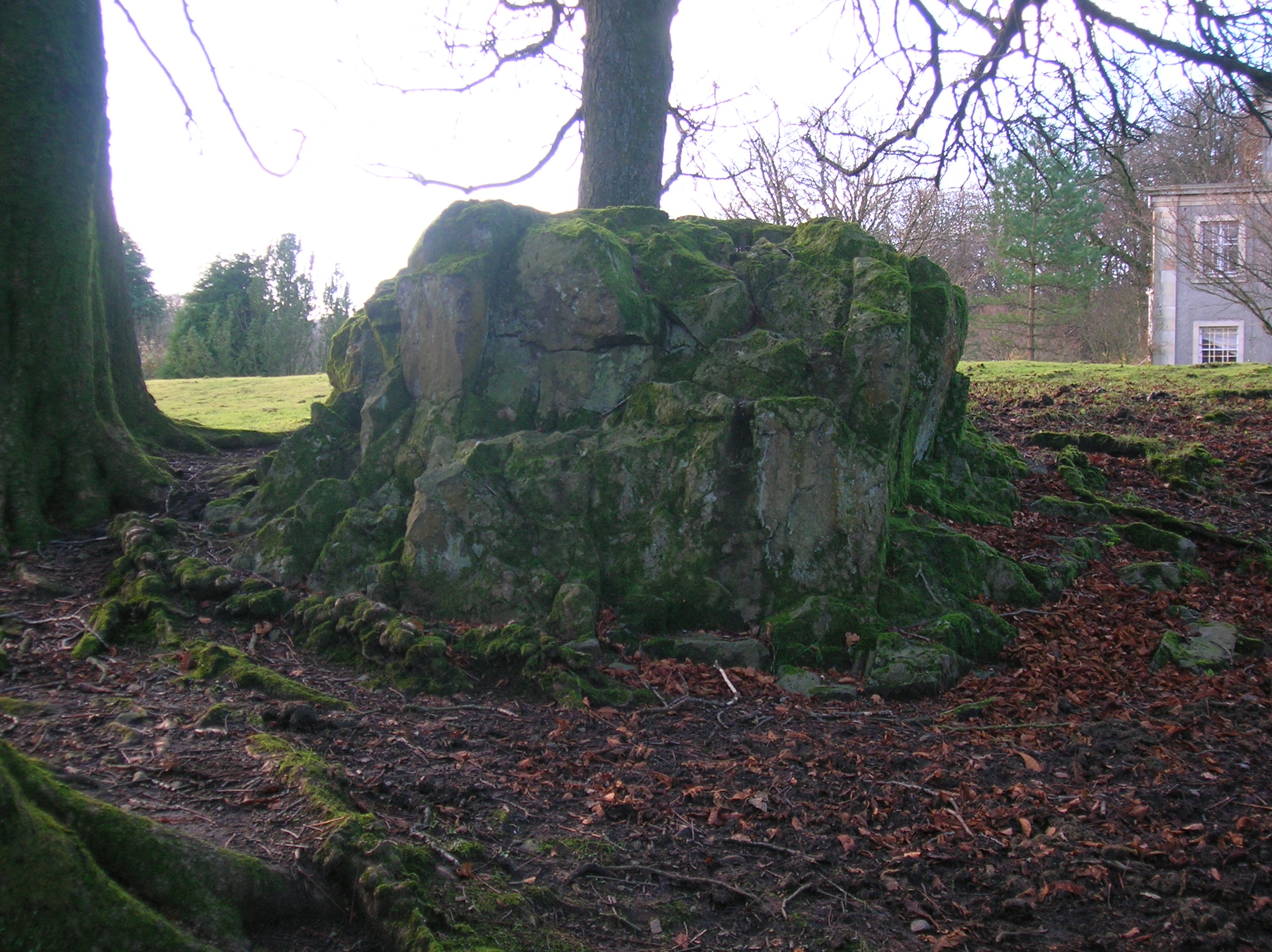
The Chuckie stone amongst the trees with Ladyland house in the background.

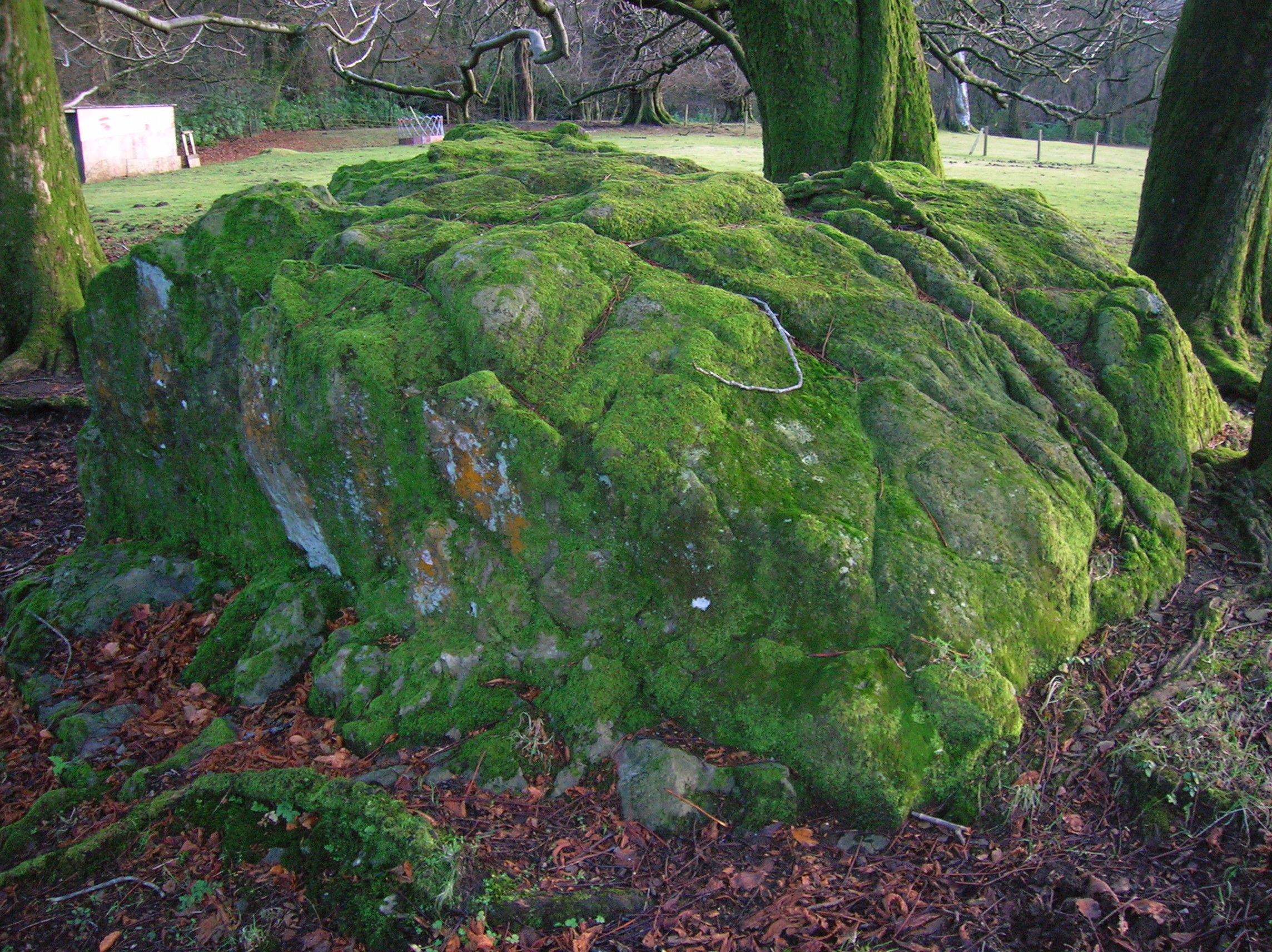
The Chuckie stone from above.

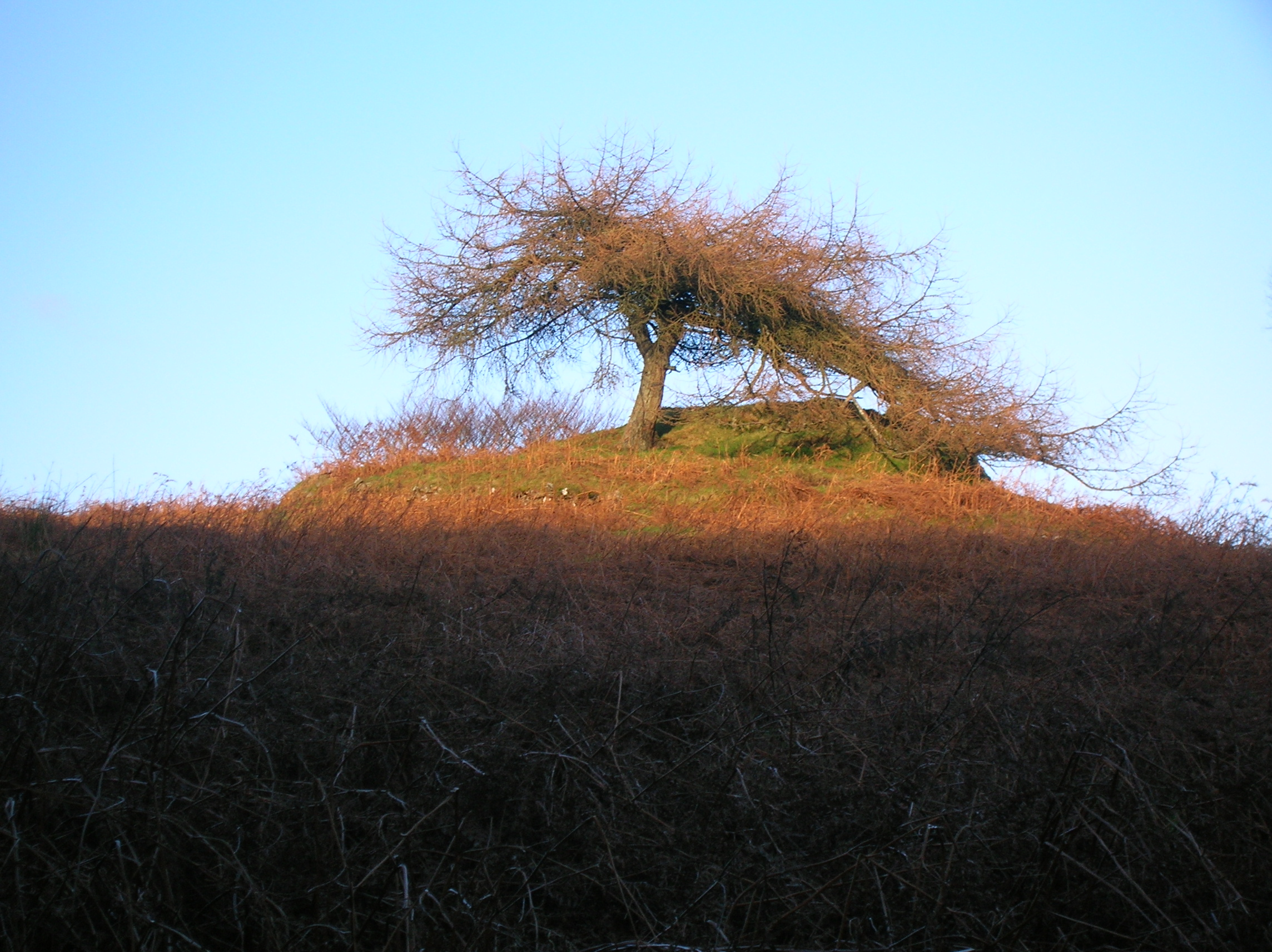
The Cat Craig in the dying winter sunshine.

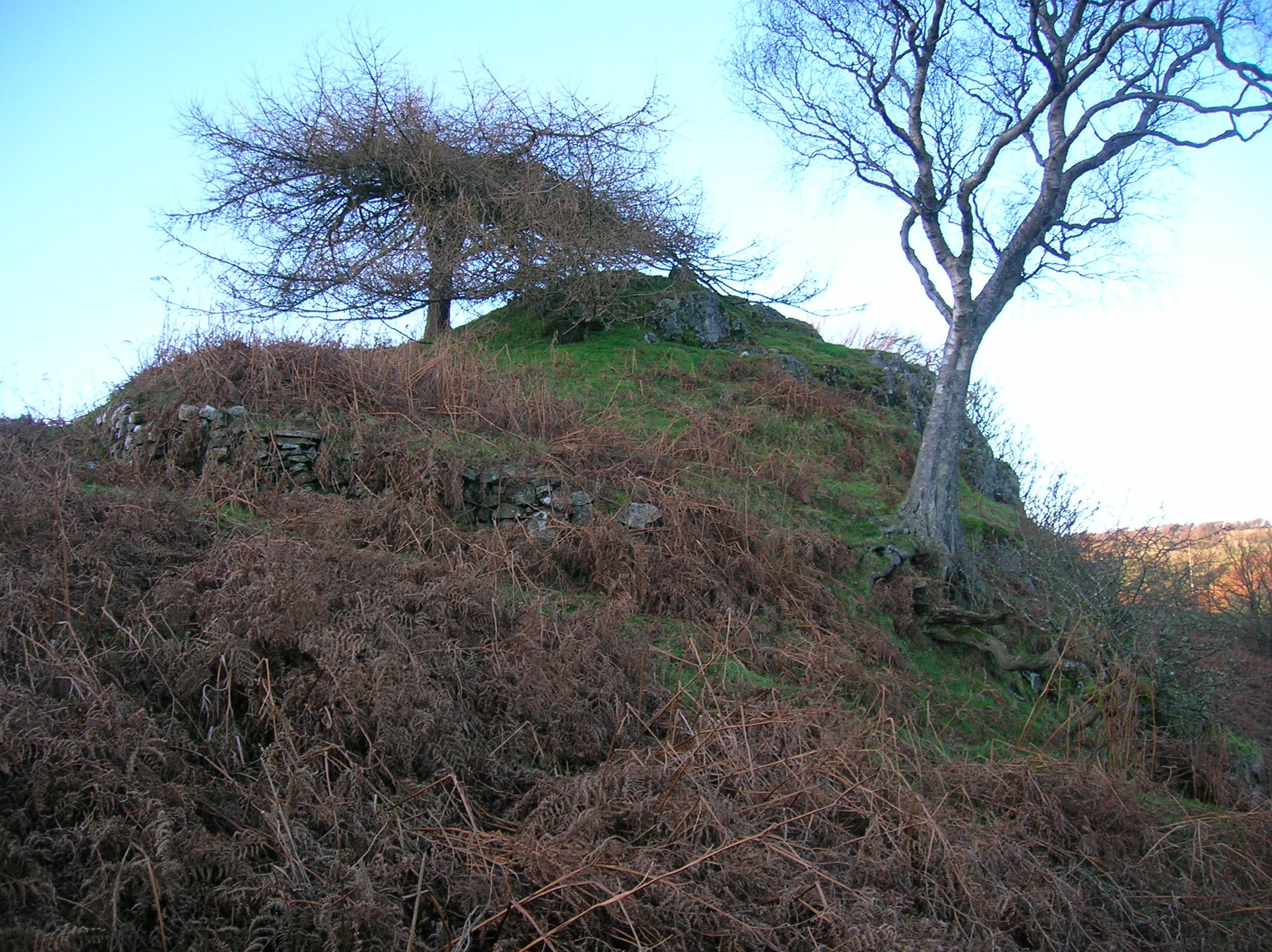
The Cat Craig showing the drystone walling.

On the hills above Ladyland are the signs left by ancient cultivation of the land at a time when the climate was more appropriate for growing crops in these elevated situations. These cultivation marks were difficult to explain in times past and they were referred to as 'Elf furrows'.

== Micro-history ==
Captain William Hamilton had been a privateer during the second Dutch War and following the flight of King James II he was the captain of a cruiser fighting on the side of William and Mary. He was killed in 1689 aboard his ship when engaged in an action against French ships off Ireland who were engaged in transporting Jacobite troops to Mull.

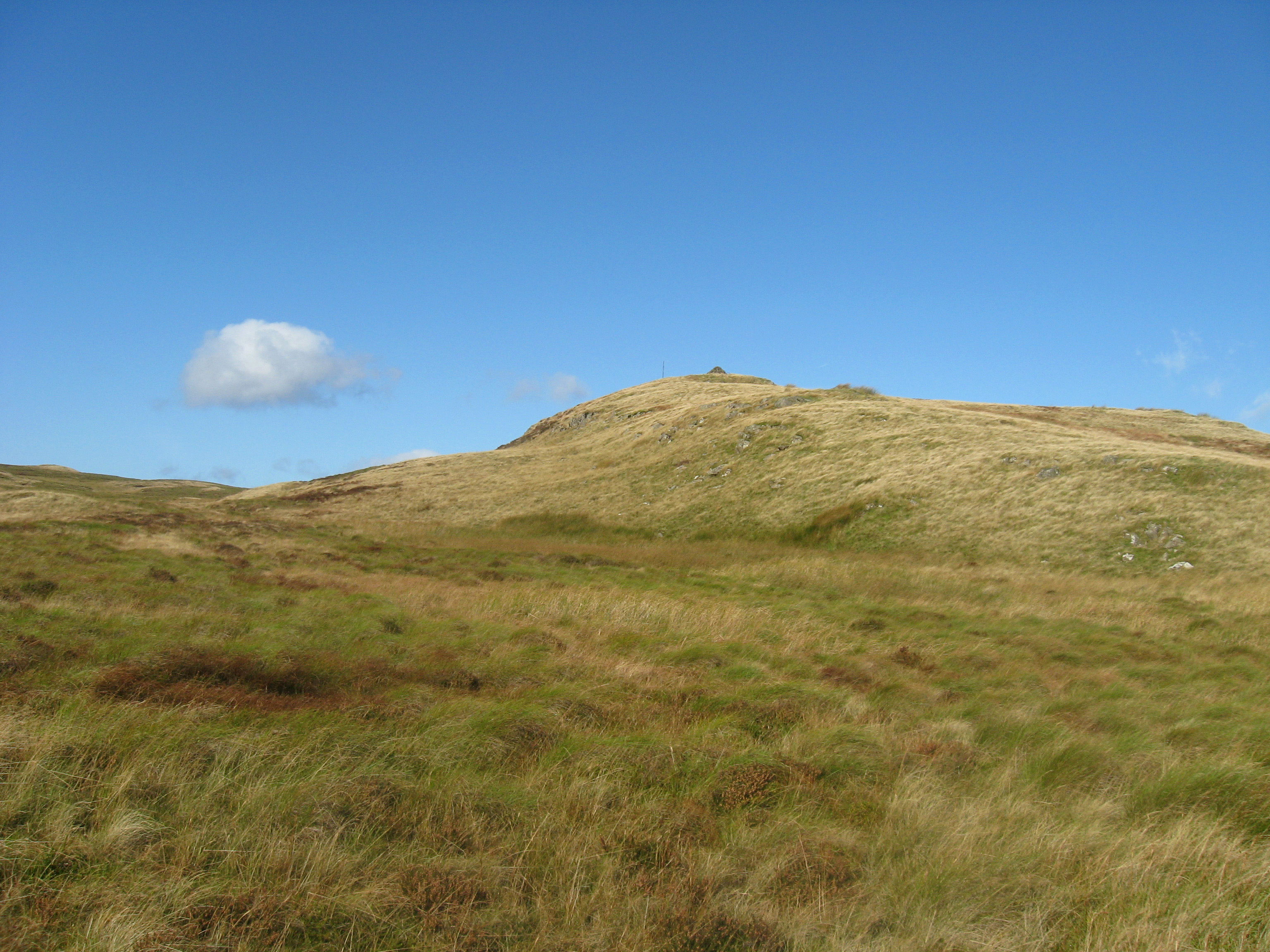
Little Auchenbourach Hill

The ancestors of the Cochran-Patricks lived originally at Edge whose ruins still stand on the hillside overlooking the road to Muirshiel Country Park, just beyond Clovenstone Cottage.

Aiton in 1811 records that J. Cochrane Esq experimented with improving coarse hill pastures by diverting a mountain rill to run over it the site and as a consequence the pasture greatly improved, enough to yield a good crop of hay. His neighbours had scorned the expense of enclosing the land with a dyke, however he proved them wrong.

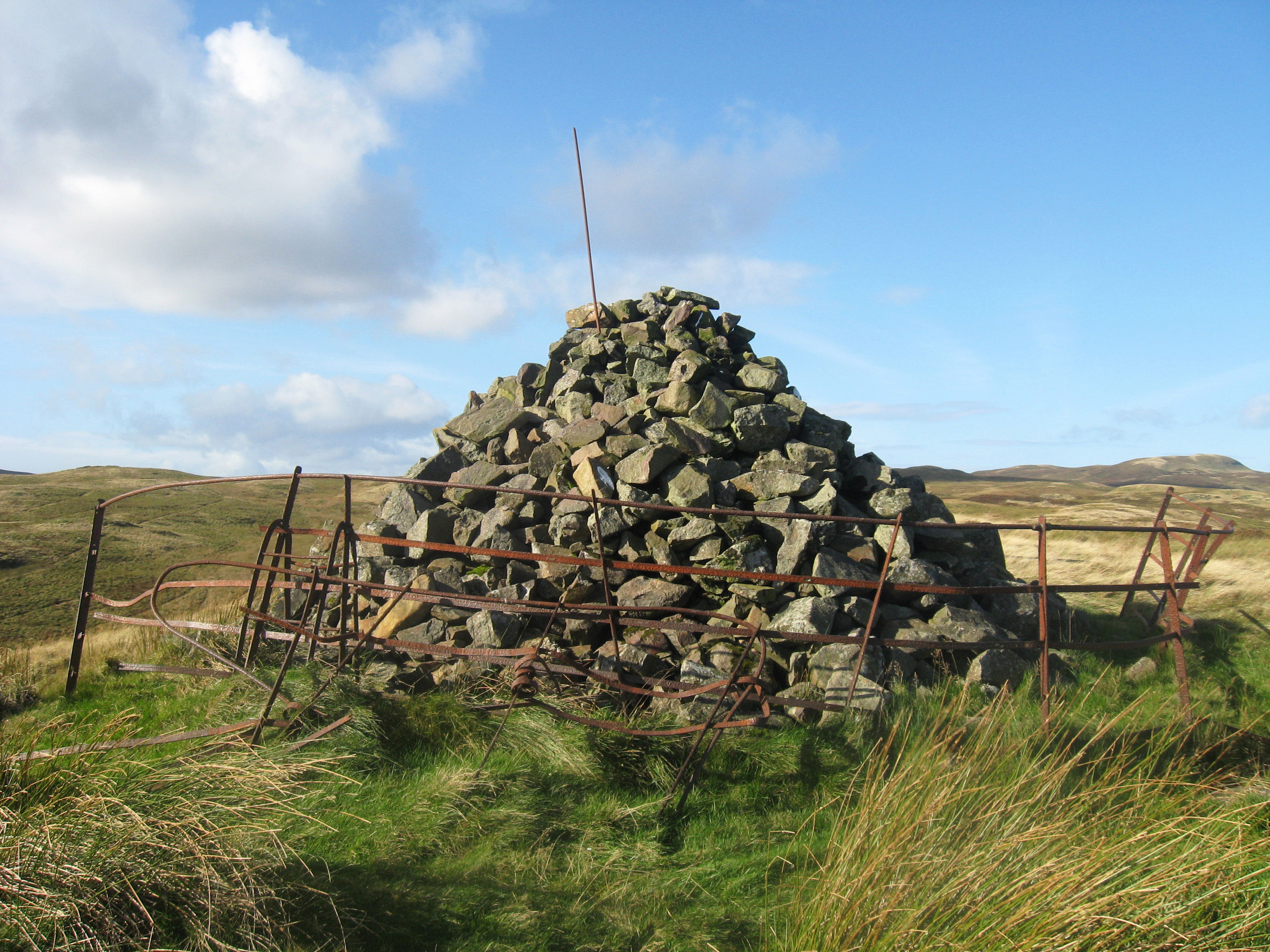
Commemorative cairn on the summit of Little Auchenbourach Hill.

On the summit of Little Auchenbourach hill, above Calder glen, is a cairn of stones surrounded by metal railings. A plaque on this cairn commemorated William Arthur Cochran-Patrick, son of R W Cochran-Patrick, who was born on 12 June 1860, and died on 29 January 1881 aged 20 of tetanus whilst studying at Cambridge University. A Latin inscription translates as 'You were loved by all.' The Cochran-Patricks of Ladyland owned Auchenbourach Hill. The monument was financed by William's friends and the tenants of Ladyland.

Eleanora Cochran-Patrick, a daughter of RW Cochran-Patrick married Sir Neil James Kennedy, however he took his wife's surnames to preserve the ancient family patronym.

In June 1911 the Misses Cochrane-Patrick of Ladyland House were driving home in their waggonette from the Kerse Mission on a Sunday night; the horse shied at a dog on the roadside and fell, overturning the machine at the same time. Miss Harriet Cochrane-Patrick who was driving was thrown to the ground and a wheel of the waggonette passed over her right shoulder while her sister, Miss Cochrane-Patrick was pinned to the ground by the overturned machine lying on her breast. The coachman, William Benson, jumped from the back seat and held the horse down till the ladies were extricated by some people who witnessed the accident. Benson had his right hand severely injured.

The horse was badly hurt and the waggonette smashed. Mr Simpson of Langslie Farm, conveyed the ladies home in his machine and they were afterwards attended by Dr Milroy and Nurse Cooper. Miss Cochrane-Patrick was almost unconscious from bruises and shock and Miss Harriet Cochrane-Patrick was also bruised, but fortunately no bones were broken. Both ladies were very popular for their charitable work in the Kilbirnie and Beith districts.

== See also ==
- Hessilhead
