= Robert Lindsay, 9th Lord Lindsay =

Scottish landowner

The Right Honourable The Lord Lindsay PC

Personal details
- Born: Robert Lindsay
- Died: 9 July 1616
- Spouse: Lady Christian Hamilton (m. 1610)
- Relations: Patrick Lindsay, 6th Lord Lindsay (grandfather); Andrew Leslie, 5th Earl of Rothes (grandfather); Anne Crawford-Lindsay (granddaughter); William Lindsay, 18th Earl of Crawford (grandson)
- Children: John Lindsay, 17th Earl of Crawford, 1st Earl of Lindsay; Helen Scott, Lady Ardross
- Parent(s): James Lindsay, 7th Lord Lindsay; Lady Eupheme Leslie

Robert Lindsay, 9th Lord Lindsay PC (died 9 July 1616), was a Scottish landowner.

== Early life ==
He was the second son of James Lindsay, 7th Lord Lindsay and Lady Eupheme Leslie. His elder brother was John Lindsay, 8th Lord Lindsay (who married Hon. Anne Oliphant, granddaughter of Laurence Oliphant, 4th Lord Oliphant). His sisters included Hon. Jane Lindsay (wife of Robert Lundie of Balgonie), Hon. Helen Lindsay (wife of John Cranstoun, 2nd Lord Cranstoun), and Hon. Catherine Lindsay (wife of James Lundie of that Ilk).

His paternal grandparents were Patrick Lindsay, 6th Lord Lindsay and Euphemia Douglas (a daughter of Sir Robert Douglas of Lochleven, who was killed at the Battle of Pinkie Cleugh in 1547, and Lady Margaret Erskine, a mistress of King James V of Scotland who was a daughter of John Erskine, 5th Lord Erskine). His maternal grandparents were Andrew Leslie, 5th Earl of Rothes and Grizel Hamilton (a daughter of Sir James Hamilton of Finnart).

== Career ==
Lindsay inherited the Lordship Lindsay of the Byres upon the death of his brother in November 1609 who died without male issue. Following his brother's death, the estate of Byres was sold to the 9th Lord's father-in-law, Thomas Hamilton, 1st Earl of Haddington.

Lord Lindsay was the Scottish Ecclesiastical High Commissioner. He was made a Privy Councillor of Scotland in 1610 and 1616.

== Personal life ==
On 26 June 1610, Lindsay married Lady Christian Hamilton, eldest daughter of Thomas Hamilton, 1st Earl of Haddington and Margaret Borthwick (only child of James Borthwick of Newbyres). Before his death in 1616, they were the parents of:

- John Lindsay (c. 1611–1679), who married Lady Margaret Hamilton, a daughter of James Hamilton, 2nd Marquess of Hamilton and Lady Anne Cunningham (fourth daughter of James Cunningham, 7th Earl of Glencairn).
- Hon. Patrick Lindsay, who died young.
- Hon. Helen Lindsay, who married Sir William Scott of Ardross and Elie, in 1634.
- Hon. Margaret Lindsay Married William Welsche (Son of Reverend Josias Welsche and Elizabeth Knox.)

Lord Lindsay died on 9 July 1616 and was succeeded in the Lordship by his only surviving son, John (who was created the 1st Earl of Lindsay in 1633, and inherited the Earldom of Crawford in 1652). After his death, his Lady Christian married, as his second wife, Robert Boyd, 7th Lord Boyd, sometime after 9 December 1617. She died in 1645.

=== Descendants ===
Through his daughter Helen, Lady Ardross, he was posthumously a grandfather of Euphemia Scott, who married William Cochrane, 1st Earl of Dundonald, the Shire Commissioner for Ayr.

Through his son John, he was posthumously a grandfather of Lady Anne Lindsay (wife of John Leslie, 1st Duke of Rothes), Lady Christian Lindsay (wife of John Hamilton, 4th Earl of Haddington), William Lindsay, 18th Earl of Crawford, Hon. Patrick Lindsay (later Crawford of Kilbirnie), Lady Helen Lindsay (wife of Sir Robert Sinclair, 3rd Baronet, of Stevenston), and Lady Elizabeth Lindsay (wife of David Carnegie, 3rd Earl of Northesk).

Peerage of Scotland
| Preceded by John Lindsay | Lord Lindsay of the Byres; 1609–1616 | Succeeded by John Lindsay |
