= John Lindsay, 8th Lord Lindsay =

Scottish nobleman

The Right Honourable The Lord Lindsay PC

Personal details
- Born: John Lindsay
- Died: 5 November 1609
- Spouse: Hon. Anne Oliphant (m. 1599)
- Relations: Patrick Lindsay, 6th Lord Lindsay (grandfather); Andrew Leslie, 5th Earl of Rothes (grandfather); John Lindsay, 17th Earl of Crawford, 1st Earl of Lindsay (nephew)
- Children: Anne Falconer, Lady Falconer
- Parent(s): James Lindsay, 7th Lord Lindsay; Lady Eupheme Leslie

John Lindsay, 8th Lord Lindsay PC (died 5 November 1609), was a Scottish landowner.

== Early life ==
He was the eldest son of James Lindsay, 7th Lord Lindsay and Lady Eupheme Leslie. His younger brother was Robert Lindsay, a Scottish Ecclesiastical High Commissioner. His sisters included Hon. Jane Lindsay (wife of Robert Lundie of Balgonie), Hon. Helen Lindsay (wife of John Cranstoun, 2nd Lord Cranstoun), and Hon. Catherine Lindsay (wife of James Lundie of that Ilk).

His paternal grandparents were Patrick Lindsay, 6th Lord Lindsay and Euphemia Douglas (a daughter of Sir Robert Douglas of Lochleven, who was killed at the Battle of Pinkie Cleugh in 1547, and Lady Margaret Erskine, a mistress of King James V of Scotland who was a daughter of John Erskine, 5th Lord Erskine). His maternal grandparents were Andrew Leslie, 5th Earl of Rothes and Grizel Hamilton (a daughter of Sir James Hamilton of Finnart).

== Career ==
Lindsay inherited the Lordship Lindsay of the Byres upon the death of his father in November 1601. He was made a Privy Councillor of Scotland in 1605.

== Personal life ==
Around 4 July 1599, Lindsay married Hon. Anne Oliphant, the only daughter of Laurence Oliphant, Master of Oliphant (eldest son and heir apparent of Laurence Oliphant, 4th Lord Oliphant and Lady Margaret Hay; a daughter of George Hay, 7th Earl of Erroll) and Lady Christian Douglas (second daughter of William Douglas, 6th Earl of Morton). Anne was also the sister of Laurence Oliphant, 5th Lord Oliphant. Before his death in 1609, they were the parents of:

- Hon. Anne Lindsay, who married Scottish judge Alexander Falconer, 1st Lord Falconer of Halkerton, in 1619. They separated in 1627.

Lord Lindsay died on 5 November 1609. As he had no male issue, his titles passed to his younger brother, Robert. On his death, the estate of Byres was sold to Thomas Hamilton, 1st Earl of Haddington.

=== Descendants ===
Through his only daughter Anne, he was posthumously a grandfather of Agnes Falconer (1626–1708), who married George Ogilvy, 2nd Lord Banff and became Baroness Banff.

Peerage of Scotland
Preceded by James Lindsay	Lord Lindsay of the Byres; 1601–1609	Succeeded by Robert Lindsay
