= James Lindsay, 7th Lord Lindsay =

Scottish landowner

The Right Honourable The Lord Lindsay PC

Personal details
- Born: James Lindsay; 1554
- Died: 5 November 1601 (aged 46–47)
- Spouse: Lady Eupheme Leslie (m. 1573)
- Relations: John Lindsay, 5th Lord Lindsay (grandfather); Robert Douglas of Lochleven (grandfather); Margaret Erskine (grandmother); James Stewart, 1st Earl of Moray (uncle); John Lindsay, 17th Earl of Crawford, 1st Earl of Lindsay (grandson)
- Parent(s): Patrick Lindsay, 6th Lord Lindsay; Euphemia Douglas

James Lindsay, 7th Lord Lindsay PC (1554 – 5 November 1601), Scottish landowner who was a gentleman of King James's bedchamber.

== Early life ==
James Lindsay was the only son of Patrick Lindsay, 6th Lord Lindsay and Euphemia Douglas. His only sister, Margaret Lindsay, was the first wife of James Leslie, Master of Rothes, son of Andrew Leslie, 5th Earl of Rothes and mother of John Leslie, 6th Earl of Rothes.

His paternal grandparents were John Lindsay, 5th Lord Lindsay and Helen Stewart (a daughter of John Stewart, 2nd Earl of Atholl). His maternal grandparents were Sir Robert Douglas of Lochleven (who was killed at the Battle of Pinkie Cleugh in 1547) and Lady Margaret Erskine (a mistress of King James V of Scotland who was a daughter of John Erskine, 5th Lord Erskine). From Lady Margaret's relationship with King James V, his uncle was James Stewart, 1st Earl of Moray (the Regent for his half-nephew, the infant King James VI). From his maternal grandparents marriage, his aunts and uncles were William Douglas, 6th Earl of Morton, Robert Douglas (who married Christina Stewart, 4th Countess of Buchan), Janet Douglas (who married James Colville, 1st Lord Colville of Culross), and Catherine Douglas (who married David Durie).

== Career ==
Lindsay inherited the Lordship Lindsay of the Byres upon the death of his father in December 1589. He was made a gentleman of the bedchamber of King James VI in 1580. An active Protestant, Lindsay wrote to Elizabeth I of England in favour of the Puritan preacher John Udall. In 1592 the printer Robert Waldegrave dedicated an edition of Dudley Fenner's Certain Godly and Learned Treatises to him.

On 17 November 1592 Margaret Douglas, the heavily pregnant wife of the rebel Earl of Bothwell kneeled on the street before James VI as he was going to Edinburgh Castle, and after Lord Home and Lord Lindsay spoke in her favour she was allowed to kiss the king's hand, who then spoke harshly of her and her husband. She was applauded and carried back to her lodging by well-wishers.

In January 1593, he led a group protesting at Holyrood Palace against the Catholic earls. He was made a Privy Councillor of Scotland in c. 1593.

On 17 December 1596, he was involved in a riot at the Tolbooth Church in Edinburgh against the Octavians which was declared treason. His property was forfeited. At first Anne of Denmark hoped to use the profit of his goods as a dowry for Jean Stewart, one of her ladies-in-waiting.

== Personal life ==
In 1573, he married Lady Eupheme Leslie, a daughter of Andrew Leslie, 5th Earl of Rothes and Grizel Hamilton (a daughter of Sir James Hamilton of Finnart). Together, they were the parents of at least two sons and four daughters, including:

- John Lindsay, 8th Lord Lindsay (d. 1609), who married Anne Oliphant, only daughter of Laurence Oliphant, Master of Oliphant (eldest son and heir apparent of Laurence Oliphant, 4th Lord Oliphant) and Lady Christian Douglas (a daughter of William Douglas, 6th Earl of Morton).
- Robert Lindsay, 9th Lord Lindsay (d. 1616), who married Lady Christian Hamilton, the eldest daughter of Thomas Hamilton, 1st Earl of Haddington.
- Margaret Lindsay.
- Jane Lindsay, who married Robert Lundie of Balgonie.
- Helen Lindsay (d. 1658), who married, as his second wife, John Cranstoun, 2nd Lord Cranstoun before c. 1623.
- Catherine Lindsay (d. 1620), who married James Lundie of that Ilk in c. 1605.

Lord Lindsay died on 5 November 1601. He was succeeded by his son, John.

=== Descendants ===
Through his eldest son John, he was a grandfather of Hon. Anne Lindsay, who married Alexander Falconer, 1st Lord Falconer of Halkerton.

Through his son Robert, he was a grandfather of John Lindsay (c. 1598–1678), who became the 9th Lord Lindsay in 1616, was created the 1st Earl of Lindsay in 1633, and inherited the Earldom of Crawford in 1652.

Peerage of Scotland
| Preceded by Patrick Lindsay | Lord Lindsay of the Byres; 1589–1601 | Succeeded by John Lindsay |
