= Laurence Oliphant, 4th Lord Oliphant =

Scottish nobleman

Laurence Oliphant, 4th Lord Oliphant (1529–1593) was a Scottish nobleman.

== Early life ==
He was the eldest son of Laurence Oliphant, 3rd Lord Oliphant and the former Margaret Sandilands. Among his sibling was Peter Oliphant (ancestor of the Oliphants of Langton), Catherine Oliphant (wife of Sir Alexander Oliphant of Kellie, and George Dundas of Dundas), Margaret Oliphant (wife of William Murray of Abercaimy, and James Clephane of Carslogie), Jean Oliphant (wife of William Moncreiffe of Moncreiffe), and Lilias Oliphant (wife of Robert Lundie of Balgonie).

In 1543 he was sent to England as a hostage for his father. After the marriage of Mary Queen of Scots to Darnley, while Master of Oliphant, he sat as an extraordinary member of the privy council in August 1565. In 1565 certain persons accused of serious crimes took over his house of Berrydale, which they garrisoned and held; but on 13 April 1566 they were ordered by the council to give it up to him within 24 hours under pain of being treated as rebels, i.e. being hang, drawn and quartered upon capture. He succeeded his father on 26 March of the same year, and was served heir on 2 May.

== Career ==
Oliphant sat on the assize for the trial of James Hepburn, 4th Earl of Bothwell for the murder of Darnley, signed the Ainslie Tavern Bond for Bothwell's marriage to the queen, and was one of the nine temporal lords present at the marriage. At the same time as John Hamilton he was admitted a member of the privy council. He joined the association on behalf of Mary at Hamilton on 8 May 1568, and fought for her at the battle of Langside. On this account he was charged to appear before the regent and lords of the privy council, and, failing to do so, was on 2 August 1568 denounced a rebel and put to the horn; but on 5 April 1569 he signed a "band for the king", and on 16 June again appeared as a member of the privy council.

Oliphant was one of sixteen persons appointed by Queen Mary, at Bolton Castle on 6 March 1569 to act as advisers, with the Duke of Châtellerault, the Earl of Huntly and Earl of Argyll, in the difficult circumstances of the Scottish kingdom. He attended the convention at Perth on 31 July of the same year, and voted against the queen's divorce from Bothwell. Oliphant and his servants were attacked on 18 July at the instance of George Sinclair, 4th Earl of Caithness, and were besieged for eight days in Old Wick or "Auldwick" castle by the Master of Caithness. Oliphant's complaint against the Master of Caithness was deliberated by the Privy Council on 12 October and 22 November.

After the death of the Regent Moray in January 1570, Oliphant met the leaders of the queen's party at Linlithgow, where they had a conference with the French ambassador. Henry Killigrew, in a letter to Lord Burghley in 1573, mentioned that Oliphant had joined the anti-Marian party after James Douglas, 4th Earl of Morton's succession as regent to James VI; but he had attended a meeting of the privy council at Leith in May 1572, while Regent Mar was still alive. After the retirement of Morton from the regency, Oliphant attended the meeting of the parliament in Stirling Castle on 16 July 1578, presided over by the king. In November 1580 he was charged to answer before the council for an attack on Lord Ruthven, and on 7 December caution money was set that he would on the 9th enter into ward in Doune Castle in Menteith. Subsequently, disputes between him and the Earl of Caithness often came to the privy council.

There is evidence that the 4th Lord Oliphant added two floors to the east tower of Kellie Castle in Fife in 1573. The south elevation bears the initials of his second wife, Margaret Hay. He built the castle of Newtyle or Hatton in 1575.

== Personal life ==
By Lady Margaret Hay, second daughter of George Hay, 7th Earl of Erroll. Together, they were the parents of two sons and three daughters, including:

- Laurence Oliphant, Master of Oliphant (d. c. 1584), who married Lady Christian Douglas, a daughter of William Douglas, 6th Earl of Morton of Lochleven. He was involved in the raid of Ruthven, and for this reason was in March 1584 exiled, along with his brother-in-law, Robert Douglas. They set sail for the continent, but never reached it. In January 1601, Elizabeth I heard a rumour they were prisoners and wrote to Mehmed III for their release.
- John Oliphant of Newlands.
- Elizabeth Oliphant, who married to William Douglas, 10th Earl of Angus, in 1585.
- Jean Oliphant, who married Alexander Bruce of Cultmalindie.
- Margaret Oliphant, who married Sir James Johnstone of Westerhall.

Lord Oliphant died at Caithness on 16 January 1593, and was buried in the church of Wick.

=== Descendants ===
Through his eldest son Laurence, he was a grandfather of Laurence Oliphant, 5th Lord Oliphant (1583–1631) and Anne Oliphant, who married John Lindsay, 8th Lord Lindsay, eldest son an heir of James Lindsay, 7th Lord Lindsay and Lady Eupheme Leslie (a daughter of Andrew Leslie, 5th Earl of Rothes). Their daughter, Hon. Anne Lindsay, married Alexander Falconer, 1st Lord Falconer of Halkerton.

== Notes ==
Attribution

This article incorporates text from a publication now in the public domain: Lee, Sidney, ed. (1895). "Oliphant, Laurence (1529-1593)". Dictionary of National Biography. Vol. 42. London: Smith, Elder & Co.

Peerage of Scotland
Preceded by Laurence Oliphant	Lord Oliphant; 1566–1593	Succeeded by Laurence Oliphant
