= James Scott of Balwearie =

Scottish landowner

James Scott of Balwearie (died 1606) was a Scottish landowner and supporter of the rebel earls.

He was the son of Walter Scott of Balwearie and Janet Lindsay, a daughter of John Lindsay of Dowhill. His mother had been married to Andrew Lundie, and later married George Douglas of Helenhill, a son of Sir Robert Douglas of Lochleven Castle and Margaret Erskine.

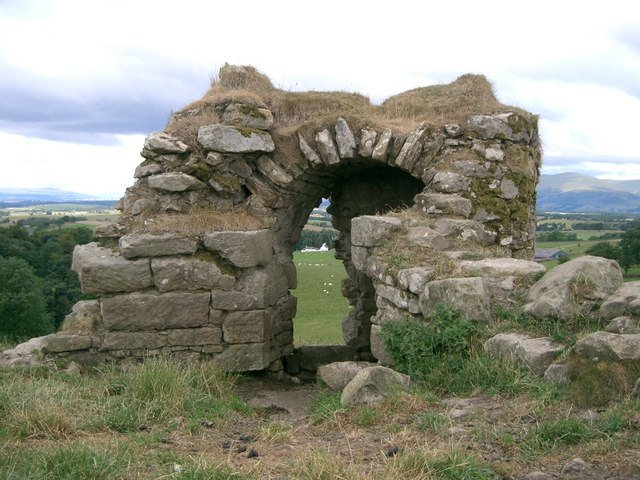
Ruins of Killernie Castle

His lands were in Atholl in Perthshire, and he had houses in Fife, Balwearie Castle, near Kirkcaldy, and Killernie Castle.

His grandfather, also William Scott of Balwearie, was a Lord of Session. His step-father, George Douglas, had helped Mary, Queen of Scots escape from Lochleven Castle in 1568.

His younger brother Robert Scott was a servant of the rebel Earl of Bothwell. He was caught in Leith with the Earl's horse Grey Valentine by Sir John Carmichael in September 1591. He was shot and fatally wounded while raiding Holyrood Palace on 27 December 1591.

On 27 June 1592 he joined with the Earl of Bothwell, the Laird of Niddrie and others to attack Falkland Palace, seeking to gain control of the king and Anne of Denmark.

Scott was agent of the rebel Catholic lords in 1594. It was rumoured he was involved in a plot to depose James VI in favour of his infant son Prince Henry. Balwearie was captured on 11 January by the Provost of Edinburgh, Alexander Home of North Berwick and imprisoned in Edinburgh Castle. On 28 January 1595 he was interrogated and described a meeting in August 1594 at an ostler's house next to the Kirk of Menmuir with the Earls of Bothwell, Angus, Huntly, Erroll, Caithness and others including James Douglas of Spott. These nobles subscribed to a band, a treasonous league, to defend themselves against the king, James VI. At a second meeting in Angus a plan to capture James VI at Stirling Castle was discussed. Following their victory at the battle of Glenlivet, the Earl of Huntly sent a messenger to Flanders and the Pope to report their "happy success".

Walter Scott of Buccleuch asked Anne of Denmark to intercede for his life. He was imprisoned and fined 12,000 Scottish merks.

Balwearie, his brother Robert, and the younger Kinnaird of Carse were taken to Stirling Castle on 30 April 1595 and made to testify in the Chapel Royal before a group of Church ministers, who then agreed to excommunicate those with the earls at Menmuir.

He died in 1606.

== Family ==
James Scott married Elizabeth Wardlaw, daughter of Andrew Wardlaw of Torrie. Their children included:

- Barbara Scott, who married David Graham of Fintry.
- Janet Scott, who married John Boswell, son of John Boswell of Balmuto
- James Scott of Logie, who married Katherine Creick.
