= George Douglas of Helenhill =

Scottish courtier and diplomat

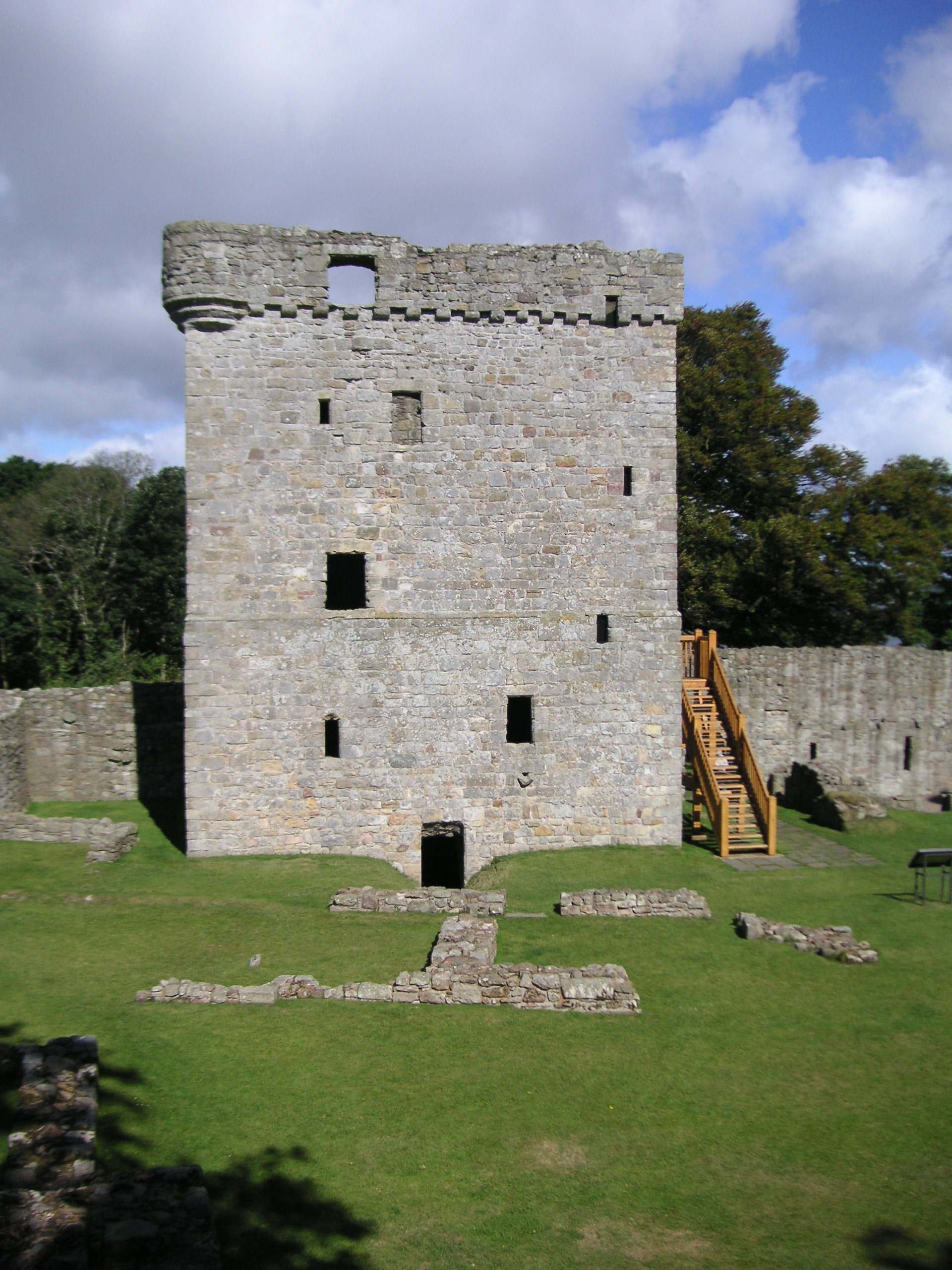
George Douglas lived at Lochleven Castle

George Douglas of Rumgally and Helenhill was a Scottish courtier and diplomat. He was involved in the escape of Mary, Queen of Scots from Lochleven Castle in May 1568. After the battle of Langside he accompanied her to England. He was involved in plans to return Mary to rule in Scotland and carried letters written in cipher code.

== Little Geordie Douglas ==
George Douglas was a son of Robert Douglas of Lochleven and Margaret Erskine. He was a younger brother of William Douglas of Lochleven, later Earl of Morton. He is said to have been called "P[r]ettie Geordie", and the English diplomat Thomas Randolph called him "pettie George Douglas". Robert Bowes called him "little George Douglas". The French historian Louis Wiesener noted that Mary and James VI called him the "petit singe", the little monkey, in their correspondence.

Willie Douglas, who also took a leading role in Mary's escape from Lochleven, was sometimes called "Little Douglas" or "litle William Dowglas". Willie was said to be an orphan, or George's half-brother or nephew. He was a servant at Lochleven Castle.

George Douglas acquired the lands of Rumgally near Cupar by marriage, and in May 1582 bought Helenhill in Fife near St Andrews, now known as Allanhill. Rumgally is sometimes spelled "Rumgawy" in older publications.

== Mary, Queen of Scots, and Lochleven Castle ==
Mary, Queen of Scots, was taken to Lochleven Castle after the battle of Carberry Hill in June 1567. For a time, she was she able to make grants using the privy seal, and she rewarded John Drysdale and George Douglas, who was given an income from the lands of Tillicoultry. Drysdale was a servant of the laird of Lochleven, William Douglas. He bought supplies for Mary at Lochleven. Another servant at Lochleven, James Drysdale, became an enemy of Willie Douglas and threatened Mary.

George Buchanan wrote that Mary and George became familiar while playing a game during moments of leisure. George Douglas is said to have become a firm ally of Mary, Queen of Scots, when she was compelled to abdicate at Lochleven in July 1567. Claude Nau wrote that Douglas spoke to Mary and undertook to prevent her enemies taking her from the castle to a worse fate. Mary would later claim Douglas as a witness to her forced abdication. A memoir of Mary's captivity sent to Cosimo I de' Medici by his ambassador in Paris, Giovanni Maria Petrucci, names George Douglas and Robert Melville as witnesses to her being threatened and pressured to abdicate.

By October 1568, William Drury heard of suspicions that there was "over great familiarity" between Mary and George Douglas. In April 1568, Drury heard a rumour that when James Stewart, 1st Earl of Moray visited the castle, Mary had talked about marrying again "and named one to her liking, George Douglas, brother to the laird of Lochleven". At this time, Lord Methven was also mentioned as a possible husband for the captive queen. The Spanish ambassador in London, Diego Guzmán de Silva pointed out that such a marriage for Mary to a mutual relation would benefit Moray's rule as Regent. Mary made her first attempt to escape the island on 25 March, dressed as her laundress.

Moray (who was George's half-brother) had George excluded from the island. George Douglas stayed nearby at Kinross waiting for Mary to make her getaway. His parents had built a new mansion, known as the "New House", at the site of the Kinross House. John Drysdale secretly carried letters between Mary and George.

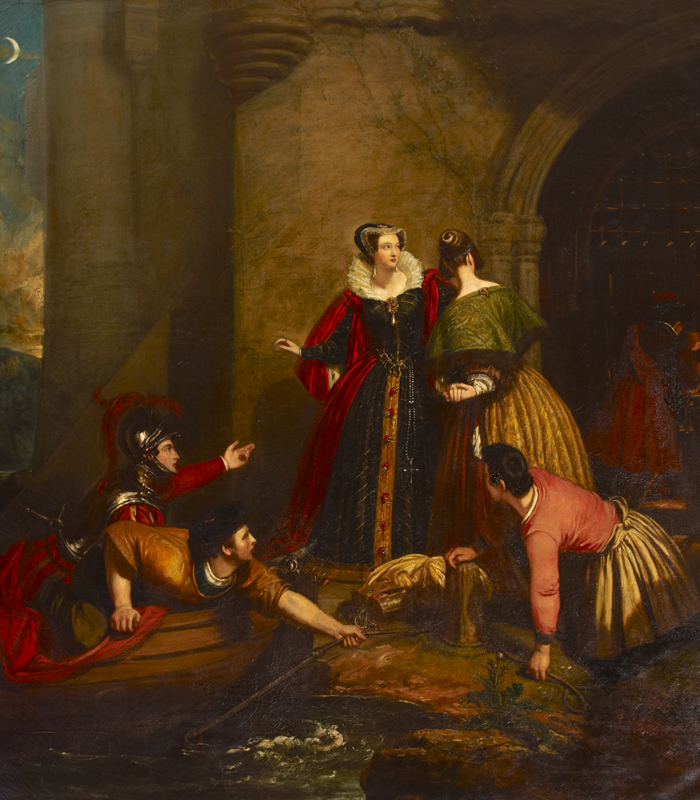
Mary, Queen of Scots, leaving Lochleven, by Edward Daniel Leahy

Accounts of Mary's escape from the castle on 2 May 1568 vary, possibly conflating reports of an earlier attempt. George Douglas is said to have exchanged signals and tokens with the Queen's chamberer Marie Courcelles, including a pear-shaped pearl earring, and rowed the boat from the island, or waited on the shore with John Beaton and horses for her ride to Niddry Castle and the west of Scotland. Claude Nau mentions that Willie Douglas was in charge of boats on the loch, and he is also said to have taken the castle keys while the Laird was at supper. A report sent to England gave this account:

George Douglas, brother to the Laird of Loughleven, who was in fantasy of love wythe hir, and had provyded this money of before, met her at the loughe side, accompanyd with the laird of Ricarton [Alexander Hepburn], a friend of the Lord Bothwelles, and with them in company ten horse. They took away all the horses which pertained to the Laird of Lochleven so that he should not be able to followe.

Claude Nau, Mary's secretary, wrote that George's mother Margaret Erskine gave counsel against the escape. David Hume of Godscroft noted that some previous writers thought Margaret Erskine, had no foreknowledge of the escape, while others thought "she had a hand in it" and suggested that Margaret Erskine took pity on the Queen because she had promised to pardon her allies and give preferment to her younger son George Douglas.

== England and France ==
After the battle of Langside, Mary went to England. George Douglas and Willie Douglas joined her at Carlisle Castle. Later, Willie was sent away and Mary thought he had been attacked, perhaps by James Drysdale (possibly a brother of John Drysdale who had helped her escape from Lochleven). Mary heard reports that James Drysdale resented Willie Douglas's "good service" and had vowed to kill him.

Mary understood that George Douglas was to be removed from her household at Carlisle and decided to send him to France as her messenger. On 26 June 1568, Mary sent Douglas to Elizabeth I and to France with her letters. Mary wrote to the French ambassador in London, Jacques Bochetel de la Forest, asking him to obtain a passport for Douglas and give him money. Douglas also carried letters from Mary for Elizabeth, and for Charles IX of France and Catherine de' Medici. The texts of these letters refer to Douglas as their bearer or "porteur".

Mary asked Elizabeth to grant Douglas a passport to France, where he would reside for a time and learn French. He was to give Elizabeth copies of letters written by Moray's secretary John Wood. Mary hoped that the letters would undermine Elizabeth's support for Moray.

George Douglas arrived in London with a companion who was thought to be Mary's secretary. Mary had written to Charles IX that Douglas was her faithful servant "having rescued me from the clutches of my mortal enemies at the risk of his life and estrangement from his closest family". He was entrusted to recount Mary's narrative to Charles IX and Catherine expanding on the contents of her letters. She had also composed a memoir of events which stated that George Douglas and Robert Melville would be able to bear witness that she been compelled by force to sign the abdication papers at Lochleven.

In August 1568, Regent Moray feared that Douglas would use Mary's French income to raise an army to fight Regent Moray in Scotland. It was rumoured the Hamiltons would lead 1000 French troops.

Douglas visited Mary at Sheffield Castle in May 1571. She offered to assist him to marry a French woman by granting an income from her estates, but this plan seems to have fallen through, (or perhaps, the French name "La Verrerie" is a misreading of "Balwearie"). Mary asked Archbishop Beaton to help George Douglas obtain the income, recalling his extraordinary service at Lochleven, "tels services ne se font pas tous les jours" - such feats are not done every day. Eventually, Douglas used the money to marry the Lady Balwearie in 1575.

In September 1571, Mary wrote a letter to her banished servants asking them to salute George Douglas in France. Back in Scotland, he was involved in sending letters in cipher to Mary, passing six letters concealed in a walking stick to a courier at Dirleton who was arrested at the gate of Sheffield Castle.

Mary mentioned George Douglas's cipher key in a letter of 1577. Mary thought that Douglas, Alexander Erskine, and the laird of Drumquhassle were her allies close to court as Morton's regency ended. She wanted James to be taken to France. John Drysdale, who had assisted in Mary's escape, was in France in June 1577. He applied to the ambassador Amias Paulet for a passport to return to Scotland via England. Drysdale told Paulet's secretary that James VI often asked about his mother and why she was held in England.

== Court of James VI ==
In June 1579, James Murray, master of the wardrobe, was sent as ambassador to England. To help fund his journey to London, George Douglas borrowed money from his brother the Laird of Lochleven.

"George Douglas of Rungally, brother to Lochleven" was chosen as one of 24 gentleman attendants to King James when Esmé Stewart, 1st Duke of Lennox was made chamberlain. Bowes wrote that James objected to Douglas, and the Masters of Cassillis, Livingstone, Elphinstone, and Ogilvy, but Lennox insisted on their appointments. George Douglas became a gentleman and then an usher of the bedchamber to James VI in December 1580. With other courtiers, he signed the Negative Confession of faith on 28 January 1581.

=== Little monkey ===
James exchanged rings with his mother in January 1581, sending her a letter in French. A postscript refers to his faithful little monkey that stays beside him and would often bring her news to him. This may refer to an actual monkey owned by James, perhaps even a gift from Mary, an idea popularised by Agnes Strickland and Stefan Zweig, but it has also been suggested to be a reference to George Douglas as a messenger in contrast to Mary's secretary Claude Nau who was not allowed to approach the Scottish court. James seems to refer to George Douglas again as his little monkey in the postscript of his letter to Douglas of 7 September 1581, "my little monkey believe what "le rousseau" [red beard: Lennox] will write to you on my behalf".

== Negotiations for an associated rule ==
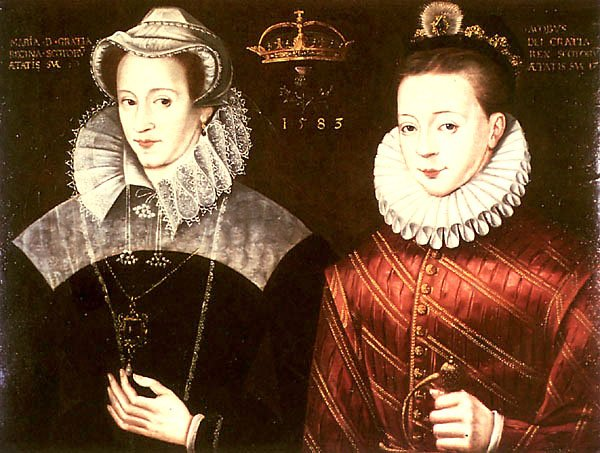
Mary, Queen of Scots and James VI, a double portrait made in 1583, possibly to promote the "association", Blair Castle.

Mary, Queen of Scots, hoped to gain her freedom and become a joint ruler in Scotland with her son James VI. Over the years, this plan developed and was known as the "Association". Mary expected that the Duke of Lennox would be her ally in this plan. In January 1581, the kirk minister John Durie condemned the "Association" from the pulpit of St Giles Cathedral citing messages carried by George Douglas.

George Douglas had been given a commission as an envoy to France in July 1580. He was entrusted to ask the French King to recognise the title of James to the Scottish throne, despite Mary's hopes for associated rule in Scotland, and renew the "auld alliance" on those terms. The impetus may have come from Esmé Stewart, Duke of Lennox, who was lukewarm at the proposition of a conjoint monarchy and an initiative that could cast doubt on the legitimacy of James's coronation. Although Douglas was given his instructions in the privacy of James's cabinet, Mary knew of Douglas's mission, and discussed this setback with Robert Beale, maintaining that George Douglas was still her faithful friend and a good servant to her son.

A deciphered report of Douglas's French mission made by the Spanish ambassador Juan Bautista de Tassis names him "Jorge Dun Bles". De Tassis explained that Douglas was sent to sound out the renewal of the Auld Alliance, "las alianças antiguas", in the name of James VI, as the French monarchy had not yet recognised James as king of Scotland. However, Mary's diplomat in France, Archbishop Beaton, prevented Douglas holding discussions, and told De Tassis that the initiative came from the Duke of Lennox. Beaton produced a statement from Mary that she authorised Douglas's return to Scotland without carrying out his instructions from the Scottish court.

The English ambassador Henry Cobham also described Douglas waiting in Paris after receiving conflicting instructions from Mary, Beaton, and John Lesley, and from the Scottish court. Douglas said he remained in Paris waiting for "gallant" clothes to made for James, Lennox, and black satin livery for the royal pages. He left for Scotland on 21 October 1581. The treasurer's accounts for December include a payment of £5000 Scots to Lennox for clothes brought from France.

Despite the events in Paris, Mary recommended George Douglas, her son's "first usher", to the Spanish ambassador in London, Bernardino de Mendoza, as a good contact for him at her son's court. Douglas brought Mary's letters to James VI, and he replied to her in encouraging terms from Dalkeith Palace on 28 May 1582, assuring her that the leading courtiers the Earl of Arran and the Duke of Lennox would both work to accomplish the association.

=== Arrested at Stirling ===
After the Raid of Ruthven in August 1582, Scotland was governed by nobles who favoured alliance with England and were less interested in Mary's plans. Douglas was summoned to Stirling Castle in September 1582 and was arrested as a conspirator. There were rumours in the diplomatic community that Douglas was tortured to reveal plans for French involvement in Scotland, at the suggestion of the English diplomat Robert Bowes. Bowes wrote to Francis Walsingham, expecting results from Douglas's interrogation:

It is righte certaine that George Douglas here in warde, and to be examyned upon any articles to be ministered to him, can of his owne knowledge discover sundrie perilous practices intended againste her Majestie and this state. And beginning once to open his budget [bag], he may peradventure be drawne to show such secrett ways as may be profitable ... especiallie in case the articles to be laid to him shall contain any fit matter to draw out any plain confession".

Bowes invited Walsingham to "send hither" anything that might "advance this purpose". Douglas was questioned on 14 September about the "association" and about correspondence between Lennox and the French ambassador in London Michel de Castelnau, sieur de la Mauvissière. He admitting to carrying letters between Mary and Lennox and that Castelnau had forewarned Lennox of a plot against him. Mary's letters, deciphered in 2023, thank Castelnau for warning Lennox. Bowes had heard reports of an attempted coup in August 1580, when Lennox had ordered the gates in Edinburgh's town walls to be shut, and had noticed that Lennox received "frequent and good intelligence" from sources in England and from Mary via France.

Bowes and George Carey were at Stirling with James VI at the time of the interrogation. Bowes was given a copy of Douglas's answers by John Colville. Having received confirmation at Stirling of Castelnau's forewarning, Carey wrote to William Cecil that correspondence between Castelnau and Lennox would be intercepted, "lime twigs are laid to catch both their hasty messengers".

Cecil collated Douglas's confession and intercepted letters from Archibald Douglas to use against Castelnau. Douglas was said to have advised Castelnau of plots against Lennox made by the Earl of Angus. Walsingham, suspecting French designs in England, began to monitor Castelnau and the French embassy more closely, and sought to intercept correspondence. For a time he employed a young Scottish poet William Fowler. Eventually, in November 1583, Walsingham uncovered the Throckmorton Plot.

Mary wrote to the new ambassador in London, Bertrand de Salignac de la Mothe-Fénelon, in December 1582 with a list of her requirements. He was to seek the release of George Douglas if he was still held in Scotland.

=== Working for Mary ===
In March 1583, Bowes learnt that "little George Douglas" and William Stewart, Captain of Dumbarton Castle had copies of Lennox's negotiations for the treaty of the "association".

Douglas wrote a letter to Mary's ally Archbishop Beaton, assuring him of his continued support and mentioning that William Schaw might travel to France. Douglas wrote from Glendoick, a property near Perth belonging to his wife's family. Schaw was in Paris in May 1583 and is said to have returned to Scotland with Lennox's heart.

Douglas went to France in June 1583. In a letter to his brother he mentioned nothing should be done in his affairs without his wife's consent. Mary's letter to "my good George" of 12 May 1584 survives as a deciphered copy by Thomas Phelippes. She referred to his letter of the previous August. Mary mentioned that William Douglas of Lochleven, the Laird of Cleish, and the Colvilles had spoken unreverently and "exercise some ill offices against us".

When Douglas went to France again in October 1585, he told an English diplomat in Edinburgh, Edward Wotton, that he planned to visit the Duke of Guise. Wotton reported to Walsingham that Douglas was working for Mary's faction. He returned in March 1586. Walsingham heard that he had written to his brother, the Laird of Lochleven, advising that the Queen's faction would regain the upper hand in Scotland.

== Mary on trial ==
When Mary was brought to trial in England following the discovery of the Babington Plot, Lord Hamilton and George Douglas spoke to James VI, trying to persuade him to intervene. Douglas insisted that James was overly influenced by the "bad reports, devised by some slaves of the Queen of England, which he had near about him". These Scottish courtiers subsided on English pensions. Douglas argued that James ought to support his mother, who was faithful to the religion she had been brought up in.

In February 1587, after Mary's execution, Robert Logan of Restalrig wrote to Archibald Douglas that James VI intended to send "little George of Lochleven, your cousin" as an envoy to the Duke of Guise. On 6 August 1587, "litill George Dowglass" was knighted at Falkland Palace. In September 1587, he was suggested as an ambassador to go to Navarre to discuss the marriage of James VI and Catherine of Bourbon. However, on second thoughts, Robert Melville's brother James Melville of Halhill was instead chosen to travel with the returning diplomat Guillaume de Salluste Du Bartas because Douglas was not considered "a friend to that alliance". James Melville proved reluctant, and finally his brother William Melville, commendator of Tongland, went to Navarre and brought back Catherine's portrait.

George Douglas was sworn in as a member of the Privy Council of Scotland on 12 January 1602.

== Marriage and family ==
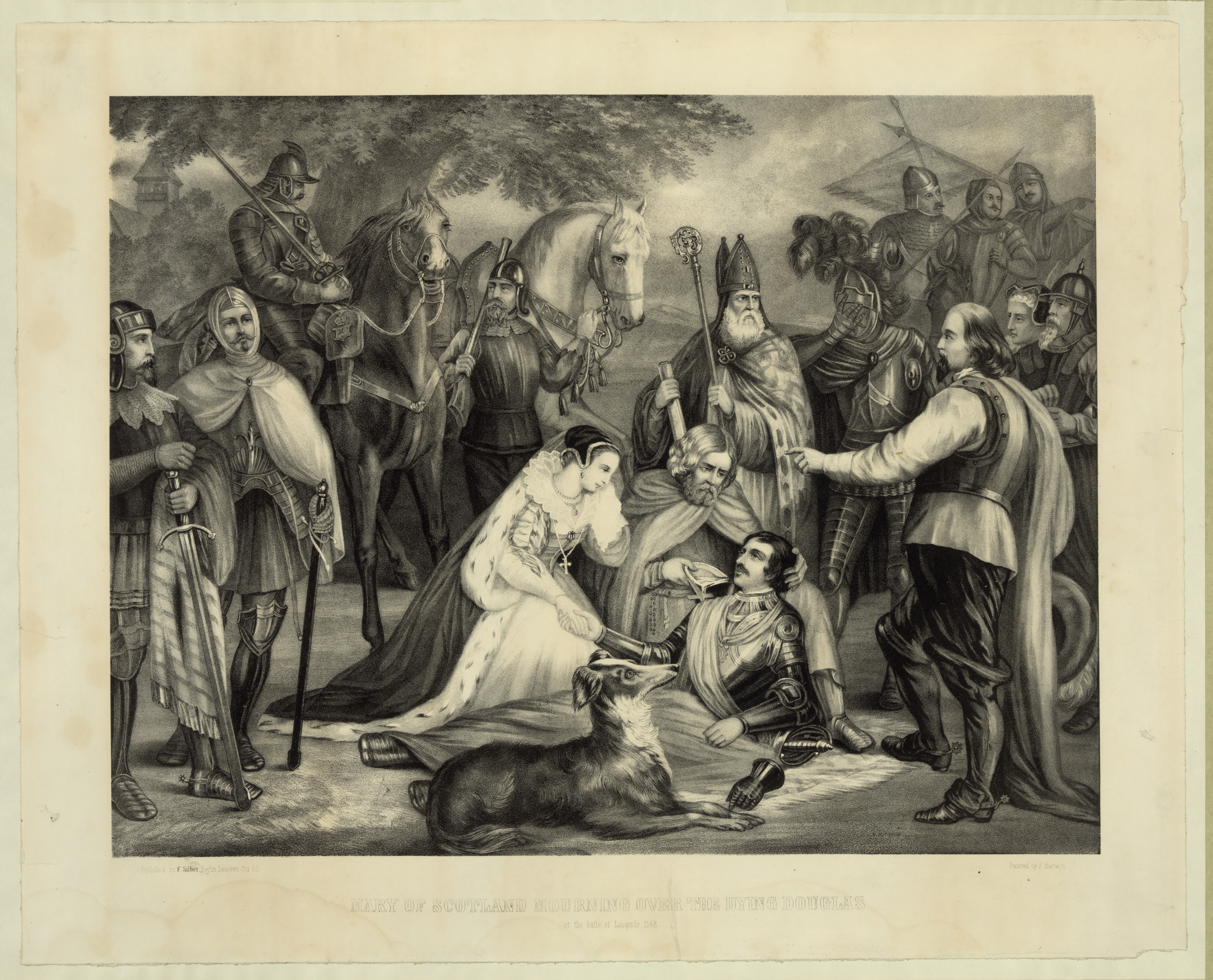
Engraving of the death of George Douglas at Langside

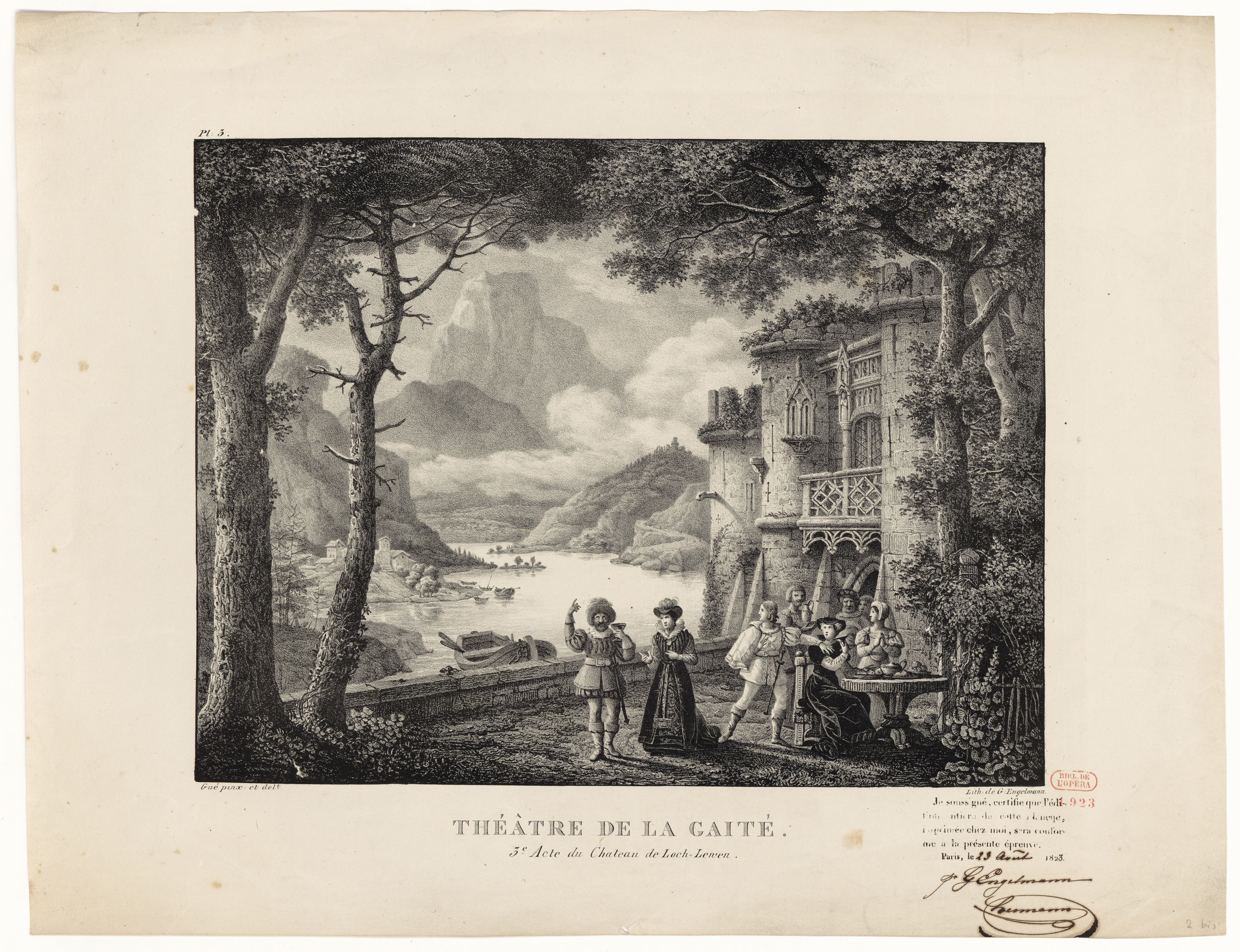
Scene from the play Le Château de Loch-Leven showing George Douglas in white and Queen Mary seated, engraved by Godefroy Engelmann after Julien Michel Gue

In 1575, George Douglas married Janet Lindsay (died 1598), a member of the Dowhill family. She had first married Andrew Lundie of Balgonie. She was the mother of James Scott of Balwearie by her second marriage and was known as "Lady Balwearie". Their daughter Margaret Douglas married George Ramsay of Dalhousie, and was the mother of William Ramsay, 1st Earl of Dalhousie.

One of the companions of King James in Denmark in 1590 was described as "George Douglas, the heir of the earl of Morton's brother". Possibly, this was George Ramsay, George Douglas's son-in-law.

George Douglas married secondly, Margaret Durie, the widow of William Scott of Abbotshall. Scott of Abbottshall and Scott of Balwearie were cautioners for Douglas during a quarrel with the Laird of Wemyss, who had married his niece Margaret Douglas. A cautioner offered a sum of money as bail for future good conduct.

George Douglas was a cautioner for Archibald Douglas in June 1582. He was the brother of the laird of Carschoghill and in 1591 his wife Barbara Napier was involved in the North Berwick Witch Trials. In 1592, George Douglas stood surety with Robert Lumsden for James Lumsden of Airdrie who had taken part in the Raid of Falkland. It has been suggested that James Lumsden's wife, Euphemia Douglas, was a close relative of George. Lumsden and Douglas, as Fife lairds, had been involved in a 1586 court case following a disturbance at Pittenweem.

From 1601, George Douglas was "tutor in law" for his infant niece Mary, Countess of Buchan, daughter of James Douglas, 5th Earl of Buchan (died 1601).

== In fiction and art ==
Walter Scott has George Douglas die at the battle of Langside in his 1820 novel The Abbot. Charles Landseer painted this fictional scene including Crookston Castle in the background. The picture was exhibited at the Royal Academy in 1837. The image was reproduced in engravings and in kits for woolwork embroidery.

George Douglas also featured as a character in the play Mary Stuart, or the Castle of Lochleven, attributed to W. H. Murray, which followed Le Chateau de Loch-Leven by René-Charles Guilbert de Pixérécourt, and was derived from The Abbot. As in Pixérécourt's play, in some productions of the Castle of Lochleven Douglas was shot from a balcony during Mary's escape. William Abbot portrayed Douglas at the Victoria Theatre in 1833. Scenes from the French play after the artist Julien-Michel Gue were published as engravings.

George Douglas is a major character in Jean Plaidy's 1963 novel The Captive Queen of Scots.
