= John Lindsay, 17th Earl of Crawford =

Scottish nobleman (c. 1598–1679)

The Right Honourable The Earl of Crawford and Lindsay
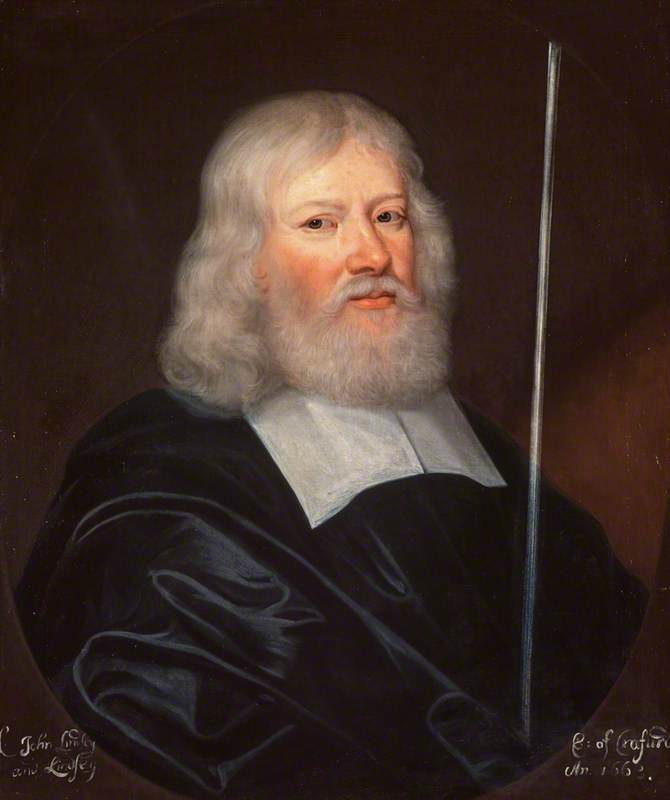
- Portrait of Lord Crawford and Lindsay

Treasurer of Scotland
- In office 1644–1663
- Preceded by: The Earl of Traquair
- Succeeded by: The Earl of Rothes

Personal details
- Born: John Lindsay c. 1598
- Died: 1679
- Spouse: Lady Margaret Hamilton (m. 1630; died 1678)
- Children: Anne Crawford-Lindsay; William Lindsay, 18th Earl of Crawford
- Parent(s): Robert Lindsay, 9th Lord Lindsay; Lady Christian Hamilton
- Relatives: Olivia Wilde (descendant)

John Lindsay, 17th Earl of Crawford, 1st Earl of Lindsay (c. 1598 – 1679) was a Scottish nobleman.

== Early life ==
Lindsay was born c. 1598. He was the eldest son of Robert Lindsay, 9th Lord Lindsay and Lady Christian Hamilton. His younger sister, Helen Lindsay, married Sir William Scott of Ardross in 1634. After the death of his father in 1616, his mother married Robert Boyd, 7th Lord Boyd.

His paternal grandparents were James Lindsay, 7th Lord Lindsay (a gentleman of King James's bedchamber) and Lady Eupheme Leslie (eldest daughter of Andrew Leslie, 5th Earl of Rothes). His mother was the eldest daughter of Thomas Hamilton, 1st Earl of Haddington and the former Margaret Borthwick (only child of James Borthwick of Newbyres). Upon the death of his paternal uncle, John Lindsay, 8th Lord Lindsay, the estate of Byres was sold on his death to his maternal grandfather, Lord Haddington.

== Career ==
Upon the death of his father in 1616, he became the 10th Lord Lindsay of the Byres. In 1633, he was created Earl of Lindsay. He also received the earldom of Crawford following the forfeiture of his cousin, Ludovic Lindsay, 16th Earl of Crawford, in November 1652 (under the terms of the 1641/2 regrant of the Earldom of Crawford).

He became Treasurer of Scotland in 1644, and in 1645 President of Parliament. During the Wars of the Three Kingdoms he played a complex role, but his position was basically a moderate Presbyterian "Engager" one. He fought for the army of the Scots Parliament at the Battle of Marston Moor, and against the royalist general Montrose at the Battle of Kilsyth, and was eventually captured by the English at Alyth.

He then changed sides, and in 1647 he signed the "engagement" for the release of Charles I, losing all his offices when his enemy, the Marquess of Argyll, obtained the upper hand. After the defeat of the Scots at the Battle of Dunbar in 1650, however, Crawford regained his influence in Scottish politics, but from 1651 to 1660 he was a prisoner in England following his capture at Alyth in an incident known as 'the Onfall of Alyth'. In 1661 he was restored to his former dignities, but his refusal to abjure the covenant compelled him to resign them two years later.

== Personal life ==
Around 1630, Lord Lindsay married Lady Margaret Hamilton (d. 1678), a daughter of James Hamilton, 2nd Marquess of Hamilton and Lady Anne Cunningham (fourth daughter of James Cunningham, 7th Earl of Glencairn). Together, they were the parents of:

- Lady Anne Lindsay (1631–1689), who married John Leslie, 1st Duke of Rothes in c. 1647.
- Lady Christian Lindsay (c. 1632–1704), who married John Hamilton, 4th Earl of Haddington in 1648.
- Hon. Margaret Lindsay (b. 1635), who died young.
- Hon. James Lindsay (b. 1636), who died young.
- Hon. James Lindsay (b. 1637), who died young.
- Hon. John Lindsay (b. 1639), who died young.
- William Lindsay, 18th Earl of Crawford (1644–1698), who married Lady Mary Johnstone, eldest daughter of James Johnstone, 1st Earl of Annandale and Hartfell and Lady Henrietta Douglas (a daughter of the 1st Marquess of Douglas), in 1670. After her death in 1681, he married Lady Henrietta Fleming (widow of the 5th Earl of Wigtown), the eldest daughter of the 2nd Earl of Dunfermline and Lady Mary Douglas (a daughter of the 7th Earl of Morton).
- Hon. Patrick Lindsay (later Crawfurd of Kilbirnie) (1646–1681), who married Margaret Crawfurd, a daughter and co-heiress of Sir John Crawfurd of Kilbirnie, in 1664.
- Lady Helen Lindsay (d. 1669), who married Sir Robert Sinclair, 3rd Baronet, of Stevenston in 1663.
- Lady Elizabeth Lindsay (d. 1688), who married David Carnegie, 3rd Earl of Northesk in c. 1669.

He was succeeded by his son William.

Peerage of Scotland
Preceded by Ludovic Lindsay	Earl of Crawford; 1652–1678	Succeeded by William Lindsay
New creation	Earl of Lindsay; 1633–1678	Succeeded by William Lindsay
Preceded by Robert Lindsay	Lord Lindsay of the Byres; 1616–1678	Succeeded by William Lindsay
