= James Douglas, 5th Earl of Buchan =

Scottish courtier and landowner (died 1601)

James Douglas, 5th Earl of Buchan (died 1601) was a Scottish courtier and landowner.

He was the eldest son of Christina Stewart, 4th Countess of Buchan and Robert Douglas, son of Sir Robert Douglas of Lochleven and Margaret Erskine.

The houses of the Earls of Buchan were Auchterhouse and Banff Castle.

He died on 24 August 1601.

He married Margaret Ogilvy, daughter of Walter Lord Ogilvy of Deskford.

Their daughter Mary Douglas, Countess of Buchan, was born in October 1601. Her uncle George Douglas of Helenhill became her "tutor in law" to manage her affairs. Mary Douglas married James Erskine (d. 1640), a son of the Earl of Mar and Marie Stewart, Countess of Mar.

The wards and living Earldom of Buchan and the castle of Auchterhouse passed to Prince Charles by the king's gift, however Walter Ogilvy of Findlater refused to deliver the property, and detained the late earl's eldest sister Christene Douglas.

Peerage of Scotland
Preceded by Christina Stewart	Earl of Buchan; 1580–1601	Succeeded by Mary Douglas
