= William Lindsay, 18th Earl of Crawford =

Scottish noble and politician

William Lindsay, 18th Earl of Crawford and 2nd Earl of Lindsay (April 1644 – 6 March 1698) was a Scottish noble and politician.

Lindsay was the eldest son of John Lindsay, 10th Lord Lindsay of the Byres, 17th Earl of Crawford, and 1st Earl of Lindsay, by his wife, Lady Christian Hamilton, daughter of the Earl of Haddington. William succeeded to the earldoms in 1678. He was a zealous Presbyterian, president of the Convention parliament in 1689, a commissioner of the treasury in 1690, and one of the commissioners for settling the government of the Church of Scotland.

He married firstly Lady Mary Johnstone, daughter of 1st Earl of Annandale and Hartfell, in 1670. They had one son:

- John Lindsay, 19th Earl of Crawford and 3rd Earl of Lindsay (1672–1713)
- Colonel James Lindsay (died 1707), was killed at the Battle of Almansa
- Patrick Lindsay, DSP

His second marriage was to Lady Henrietta Fleming, daughter of Charles Seton, 2nd Earl of Dunfermline and widow of 5th Earl of Wigtown, and had further issue.

Peerage of Scotland
Preceded by John Lindsay	Earl of Crawford; Earl of Lindsay; 1678–1698	Succeeded by John Lindsay
