= Christina Stewart, 4th Countess of Buchan =

Scottish noblewoman

Christina Stewart Douglas, Countess of Buchan (c. 1548 – 20 September 1580), also known as Christian, was a Scottish noblewoman, the suo jure Countess of Buchan.

== Career ==
She succeeded her grandfather John Stewart, 3rd Earl of Buchan in 1551. In that year she was the heir to her father, enfeoffed in the lands, jurisdictions, and offices enumerated in her grandfather's charter of 1547. She was only three years of age at her mother's death, and was placed under the guardianship of Margaret Erskine, wife of Robert Douglas of Lochleven.

In January 1549–1550, though Christina was only a young child, a contract of marriage was arranged between her and James Stewart, afterwards Earl of Moray and Regent, which would give him possession of her lands. He was the son of Margaret Erskine by King James V. Notwithstanding this contract, he later married Agnes Keith. Christina married Moray's half-brother, Robert Douglas, second son of Margaret Erskine and Robert Douglas of Lochleven. In his wife's right, Robert Douglas became Earl of Buchan and Sheriff of Banff.

When Mary, Queen of Scots was imprisoned in Lochleven Castle in July 1567, Robert Douglas, Earl of Buchan, was one of the few people allowed to visit her.

In 1574, Christina Stewart and her husband obtained a charter of the family estates, heritable offices, and the Earlshill in conjunct fee, with remainder to the heirs-male of the marriage, heirs female, heirs of the body of the Countess, and finally, to the nearest lawful heirs of the Earl. Her husband, as Earl of Buchan, took a prominent part in the political movements made in the minority of James VI, and he supported his brother Regent Moray in opposition to the adherents of Mary, Queen of Scots. After Regent Moray's assassination in January 1570, he was one of the four lords to whom the government of the country was committed in name of the King.

== Family ==
Her children included one son and three daughters:

- James Douglas, 5th Earl of Buchan;
- Christian, who married to Richard Douglas, brother of William Douglas of Whittinghame;
- Mariota, who married Alexander Irvine of Drum;
- Elizabeth, who married, in 1592, Andrew Fraser of Muchals, and had issue.

The Earl of Buchan died at Mills of Drum, near Aberdeen, 18 August, and the Countess at Aberdeen 20 September 1580.

Peerage of Scotland
| Preceded by John Stewart | Countess of Buchan; 1551–1580 | Succeeded by Robert Douglas |
