= John Lindsay, 5th Lord Lindsay =

Scottish judge

John Lindsay, 5th Lord Lindsay of the Byres (died 1563) was a Scottish judge.

John Lindsay was the son of John Lindsay of Pitcruvy, the Master of Lindsay, and grandson of Patrick Lindsay, 4th Lord Lindsay. He became Lord Lindsay of the Byres in 1526, and also assumed the disputed office of Sheriff of Fife. According to Robert Lindsay of Pitscottie he was compelled to give over some of his lands to the Earl of Angus, who was at that time very powerful because he had custody of the young James V of Scotland. He was made an Extraordinary Lord of Session on 27 June 1532. John, again an Extraordinary Lord of Session in 1541, was present at the trials of Sir John Borthwick (for heresy) and James Hamilton of Finnart (for treason).

John witnessed the death of James V at Falkland Palace. In 1543, John Lindsay and seven other lords took custody of the infant Mary, Queen of Scots, and conveyed her from Linlithgow Palace to Stirling Castle. 264. John was one of the commanders at the Scottish victory against England at the battle of Ancrum in 1545. During the Scottish Reformation, John according to Pitscottie, (or his son, Patrick Master of Lindsay), mediated between the French troops of Mary of Guise and the Protestant Lords of the Congregation at Cupar Muir on 19 June 1559, arranging a truce.

Peerage of Scotland
Preceded by Patrick Lindsay	Lord Lindsay of the Byres; 1526–1563	Succeeded by Patrick Lindsay
