= Patrick Lindsay, 6th Lord Lindsay =

Scottish courtier and Confederate lord

Patrick Lindsay, 6th Lord Lindsay of the Byres, (1521–1589), Scottish courtier and Confederate lord.

Patrick was the son of John Lindsay, 5th Lord Lindsay, who died in December 1563, and Helen Stewart, daughter of John, 2nd Earl of Atholl.

== Career ==
=== Scottish Reformation ===
According to John Knox, Patrick Lindsay took up arms in May 1559 to prevent Perth falling into the hands of the Regent Mary of Guise after the riots of the Scottish Reformation. After he helped negotiate a treaty with the Regent's forces commanded by Henri Cleutin at Cupar Muir, Patrick had a share in the expulsion of the French garrison from Perth. After the Lords of the Congregation left Edinburgh in the spring of 1560, Patrick helped William Kirkcaldy of Grange to hold the French in check in Fife, and killed in single combat the French Captain La Bastie.

In February 1560 Patrick took part in the negotiation of the treaty of Berwick. On 27 April he subscribed the band to "defend the liberty of the Evangell of Christ", and he also subscribed the "Book of Discipline". He was one of those deputed by the General Assembly on 28 May 1561 to suppress "Idolatrie and all monuments thereof," and when Mary, Queen of Scots arrived from France in August 1561, and made known her intention of having mass said in her private chapel at Holyroodhouse, he and his followers gathered in front of it, exclaiming that "the idolater priest should die the death." Claude Nau asserts that he "drove the chaplain from the chapel and overthrew all the memorials," but Knox states that Lord James (afterwards Earl of Moray) kept the door and prevented Lindsay entering the chapel.

=== Mary's personal reign ===
Lindsay was specially devoted to Lord James, who was his brother-in-law, and through his mediation Lindsay and the queen were soon reconciled. Thomas Randolph wrote to Cecil from St. Andrews on 25 April 1562, "It would well have contented your honour, to have seen the queen and the Master of Lindsay shoot at the butts against the Earl of Mar (as Lord James had become) and one of the ladies". On the rebellion of the Earl of Huntly during the queen's progress in the north of Scotland in the following September, Lindsay and William Kirkcaldy of Grange were, with their followers, specially summoned to her assistance; and Lindsay seems to have had a considerable share in winning the battle of Corrichie.

After succeeding to the lordship on the death of his father in December 1563, Lindsay contended with the Earl of Rothes on the right to the sheriffdom of Fife. Rothes obtained the sheriffdom, though on 12 January 1565 he agreed that Lindsay should be exempted from its jurisdiction. Lindsay was never reconciled to the loss of the office

Being related to Lord Darnley, Lindsay, in opposition to Moray and the stricter Reformers, favoured Darnley's marriage to the queen. In the Chaseabout Raid he "accompanied the king in leading the battle" against Moray The subsequent policy of the queen made him a zealous supporter of the plot for the murder of David Rizzio, and on the night of the murder he accompanied Morton to Holyroodhouse with a band of armed followers. On the day after the murder, according to Claude Nau, Lindsay examined food brought to Mary at Holyrood and prevented her from calling for help at a window. When Mary escaped to Dunbar, Lindsay fled to England with the other contrivers of Rizzio's murder, but the queen pardoned him, Morton, and others shortly before the murder of Darnley.

=== Mary's abdication ===
There is no evidence that Lindsay was aware of any scheme to murder Darnley, and perhaps, like his kinsman the Earl of Atholl, he deeply resented Darnley's murder. Such resentment may partly account for the prominent part he played in proceedings against Mary. He signed at Stirling the bond against Bothwell. At the battle of Carberry Hill on 15 June 1567 he asked the Confederate lords to permit him to accept Bothwell's challenge to single combat "in regard of his nearness of blood to the defunct king." The Earl of Morton presented him with the famous two-handed sword of his ancestor Archibald Bell-the-Cat, but the queen's interference prevented the encounter. Lindsay was largely responsible for the hard terms made with the queen. After her surrender, when she understood that she was practically the prisoner of the Confederate lords, she sent for Lindsay, and, giving him her hand, exclaimed, "By the hand which is now in yours I'll have your head for this."

Lindsay, along with Lord Ruthven, conveyed Mary to Lochleven Castle, and they and the lord of the castle, Robert Douglas, Lindsay's father-in-law, were jointly made her guardians. On 24 July 1567, Lindsay went to obtain her signature to the deed abdicating the crown. According to a later Catholic account, Lindsay told her "that if she did not sign the document she would compel them to cut her throat, however unwilling they might be." James Melville of Halhill wrote that Mary was told that Lindsay was in a "boasting humour" before his arrival, and that she signed the document without demur.

The next day Lindsay brought this resignation, or commission, to the Tolbooth of Edinburgh where it was read aloud. On the 29 July, immediately before James VI of Scotland was crowned at Stirling's Holy Rude Kirk, Lindsay and Lord Ruthven declared their oath that Mary had "resigned willingly without compulsion." Subsequently, Lindsay was one of the staunchest supporters of Regent Moray. In the forged Conference about the Regent Moray he is represented as saying: "My lord, ye know of ould that I was moir rude than wyse. I can nought gyve you a verie wyse counsell, but I love you weill aneuche."

After Mary's escape from Lochleven, Lindsay fought against her at Langside, and by reinforcing the right wing of the Regent's army as it was about to give way turned the tide of the battle.

In 1568 Lindsay was a commissioner at the York and Westminster conferences discussing the casket letters. Lindsay heard that Lord Herries had accused his allies, including Regent Moray, of the murder of Henry Stewart, Lord Darnley. Lindsay, lodged at Kingston upon Thames, wrote a challenge or cartel on 22 December 1568, inviting Herries to a duel. Herries, who was in London, sent a reply carried by John Hamilton of Broomiehill. Herries replied that Lindsay had accused Mary of the murder, and he did not know if Lindsay had been involved and had not said so; Herries would fight with Lindsay if he insisted, and would happily fight with any of Lindsay's allies if they cared to write to him. Herries copied the cartel and his reply to the Earl of Leicester.

=== Marian civil war ===
After the assassination of Regent Moray in January 1570, Lord Lindsay assisted in carrying the corpse of the Regent Moray at his funeral at St Giles, Edinburgh. Subsequently, during the Marian civil war, he supported the king's party. On 16 June 1571 the forces under him and Morton slew Gavin Hamilton, commendator of Kilwinning, and took Lord Home and others prisoners. On the last day of the same month, he also intercepted at Wemyss a quantity of gold sent by order of Queen Mary with John Chisholm for the defenders of the castle, from her dowry out of France. Shortly afterwards he was taken prisoner, but on 12 July he purchased his liberty. A few months later a party of horsemen from Edinburgh went to his estate of the Byres and seized a large number of his cattle, but on the following day, Lindsay, in a victorious skirmish with the enemy in the High Street of Edinburgh, took Lord Seton prisoner.

During the absence of the Regent at the parliament at Stirling, Lindsay on 23 August was chosen lieutenant in Leith. On 31 August a powerful attack was made upon him, but he drove the enemy back to Edinburgh. In 1572 the king's party elected him Provost of Edinburgh, while the siege of Edinburgh castle was in progress. Knox, whom he visited on his deathbed, advised him to have no dealings with the "damnable house of the castle." Lindsay followed this advice until the conclusion of the siege; but after its surrender he made unsuccessful efforts to induce Morton to spare the life of his old companion-in-arms, Kirkcaldy of Grange.

=== Under Morton ===
Lindsay played a less conspicuous part during the remainder of Morton's regency. In March 1578, he combined with other noblemen to effect Morton's overthrow. It was to Lindsay and Ruthven that the castle of Edinburgh was surrendered on 1 April 1578, and he was chosen one of the council in whom the administration of affairs was vested till the meeting of parliament. When Morton, after regaining possession of the king and the castle of Stirling, summoned a convention to be held there, Lindsay and Montrose, as deputies of the discontented nobles, protested that a convention held in an armed fortress could not be regarded as a free parliament. They were imprisoned in their lodgings in Stirling Castle but either Lindsay departed without license, or else his ward was extended to within Fife. In any case, he and Montrose joined the dissenting lords, who, with about seven thousand followers, marched in arms towards Stirling. A compromise, by which Morton was permitted nominally to return to power, was effected, and Lindsay became a member of the new privy council. On 1 Dec. 1579 he was appointed a commissioner for the reformation of the university of St. Andrews. He loyally adhered to Morton till the latter's fall in 1580, when he retired to his own house much discontented. He was involved in the Ruthven raid in 1582, and after the king's rescue at St. Andrews fled with other raiders to England. On his return he took part in the Gowrie conspiracy in 1584, and was committed to Tantallon Castle, but on the fall of James Stewart, Earl of Arran in November obtained his release. He died on 11 December 1589.

== Family ==
Patrick Lindsay married Euphemia Douglas, eldest daughter of Robert Douglas of Lochleven and Margaret Erskine, a half-sister of the James Stewart, 1st Earl of Moray. The marriage required a dispensation on the grounds of consanginuity.

They had a son, James Lindsay, 7th Lord Lindsay, and two daughters: Margaret, married to James Leslie, Master of Rothes, and Maulslie, married to William Ballingall of Ballingull.

James, 7th Lord Lindsay like his father, was a zealous supporter of Protestantism. He was chiefly responsible for the Protestant tumult in the Tolbooth, 17 December 1596, and was fined in large sums of money. He died 5 November 1601. By his wife Euphemia Leslie, eldest daughter of Andrew, 5th Earl of Rothes, he had two sons — John, 8th Lord Lindsay, and Robert, 9th Lord Lindsay — and three daughters: Jean, married to Rohert Lundin of Balgony; Catherine, married to John Lundin of Lundin; and Helen, married to John, 2nd Lord Cranston.

Peerage of Scotland
Preceded by John Lindsay	Lord Lindsay of the Byres; 1563–1589	Succeeded by James Lindsay
