= William Douglas, 6th Earl of Morton =

Lord Jailer of Mary Queen of Scots (c. 1540 – 1606)

William Douglas, 6th Earl of Morton (c. 1540 – 1606) was the son of Robert Douglas of Lochleven and Margaret Erskine, a former mistress of James V of Scotland.

== Career ==
=== Connections ===
William Douglas's half-brother from his mother's liaison with the king was James Stewart, 1st Earl of Moray, Regent of Scotland from 1567 until his assassination in January 1570. His cousin was another Regent of Scotland James Douglas, 4th Earl of Morton, and was closely associated with him in his career, the two men being occasionally confused in the histories.

William's father was killed at the battle of Pinkie in September 1547. His wife was Agnes Leslie, daughter of George Leslie, 4th Earl of Rothes, by whom he had eleven children. The Leslies were active in the Scottish Reformation.

=== Lochleven's prisoner ===
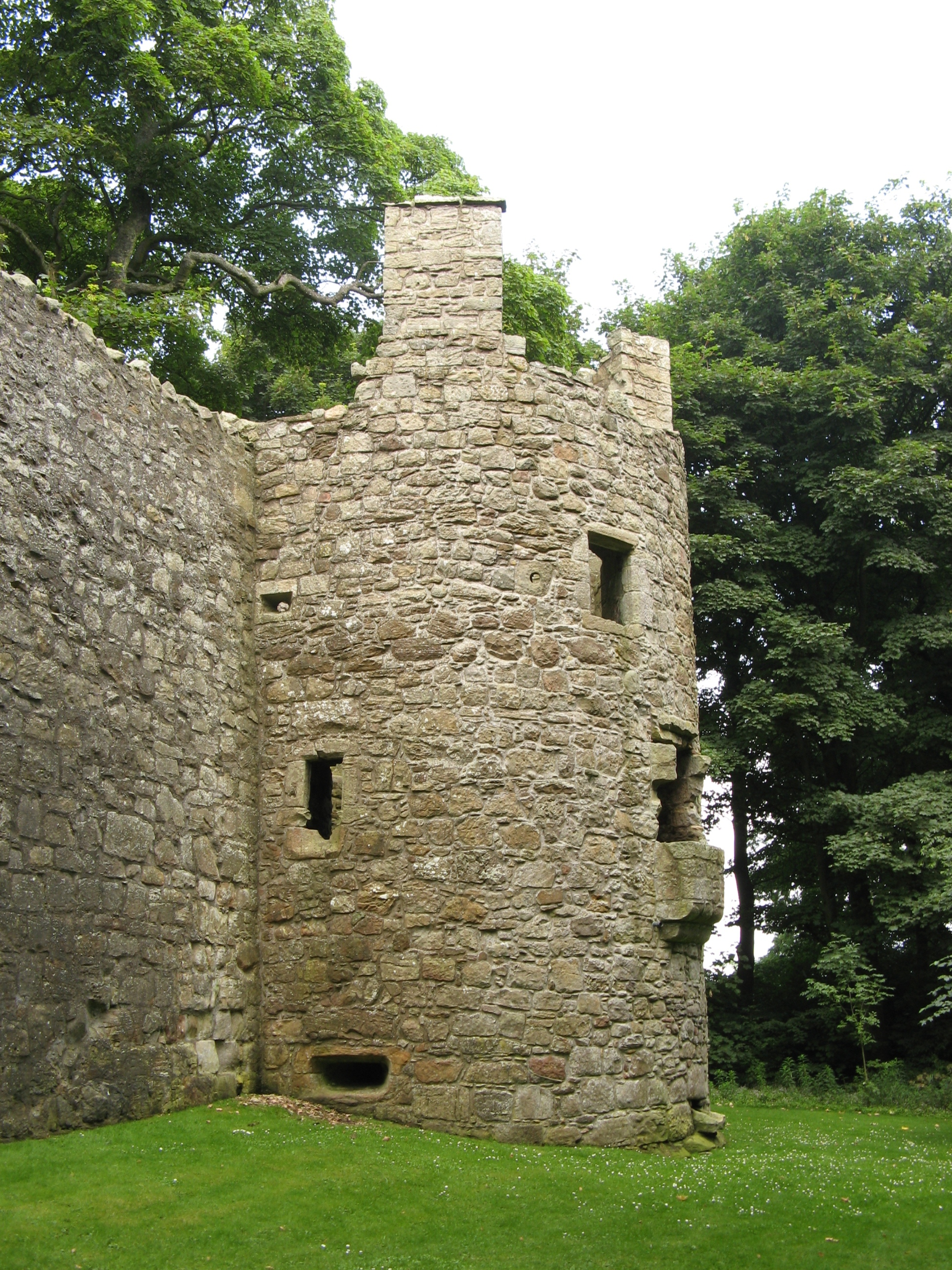
Mary, Queen of Scots was a prisoner in the Glassin Tower at Lochleven Castle

William Douglas was the owner of the island Lochleven Castle, where Mary, Queen of Scots met John Knox in April 1563. Since 1546, he and his mother had built the "Newhouse of Lochleven" on the shore of Loch Leven where Kinross House now stands. The "Newhouse" eventually replaced the island castle as the centre of the estate.

William Douglas was suspected of involvement in the murder of David Rizzio at Holyrood Palace on 9 March 1566. He later mentioned in his memoir that the lords had not intended to kill the queen's secretary. He wrote that Rizzio was "ane wekit man quha wes greitest in credit with the Quene" (a wicked man who was greatest in credit with the Queen). Douglas claimed that he had offered Rizzio £1,000 Scots to secure a pardon for the Earl of Moray, declared a rebel for the "Chaseabout Raid", but Rizzio asked for £20,000.

In June 1567, Queen Mary was imprisoned at Lochleven Castle following her surrender at the Battle of Carberry Hill. On 24 July she was forced to sign abdication papers at Lochleven in favor of her infant son James VI. William Douglas was a reluctant jailor. He had a legal paper drawn up on 28 July 1567, which stated that he was not present when the Queen signed her "demission" of the crown and did not know of it, and that he had offered to convey her to Stirling Castle for her son's coronation which was the following day, which offer she refused. Mary also signed that paper. However, in 1581 Mary wrote that William was one of her few remaining enemies in Scotland, and should have witnessed that she was compelled to assent to her resignation. The Scottish government directed by his half-brother paid William Douglas £1,289-12d for keeping the Queen.

William's wife, Lady Agnes Leslie, became the Queen's chief female companion during her ten and a half months of imprisonment, accompanying her throughout the day and often sleeping in her bedchamber. Queen Mary had an opportunity of greater liberty following the birth of Agnes's child when she was recovering from her pregnancy. Mary chose to escape on 2 May 1568 from Lochleven with the aid of Sir William's brother George, and a young orphaned cousin named William Douglas who also lived at the castle and may or may not have been the earl's illegitimate son. When Sir William learned of his royal captive's escape, he was so distressed that he attempted to stab himself with his own dagger.

William Douglas's half-brother, Regent Moray was assassinated in January 1570, and William was nominated as one of his executors. In April 1570, John Wood, the former secretary of Regent Moray visited Lochleven. He found that Sir William had left for Stirling, so he followed him and caught up with him after four miles. At Lochleven Castle, Wood spoke to Margret Erskine, Lady Lochleven. She was looking after the daughter of Agnes Keith, Countess of Moray. The child was "merry and very lusty". Her nurse was pregnant and wanted go home. In Edinburgh, William Douglas helped Wood check the coffers containing Agnes Keith's clothes at Holyrood Palace and her possessions at St Andrews Castle, now in his keeping.

In October 1570 William Douglas was the keeper of the Earl of Northumberland at Lochleven castle and wrote to the English diplomat Thomas Randolph mentioning that Loch Leven was liable to freeze.

=== Ruthven Raid and Earl of Morton ===
The title Earl of Morton was declared forfeit in 1581 when Regent Morton, the 4th earl, was attainted; and the title was granted to John Maxwell, 8th Lord Maxwell, a grandson of the 3rd earl. While Regent Morton was on trial in January 1581, William and other leading members of the family were not allowed to come to Edinburgh, and in March he was ordered to live north of Cromarty. A year later he joined in the Raid of Ruthven. When this faction was defeated, Douglas was exiled first to the north of Scotland, and warded in Inverness Castle. He then to France at La Rochelle, returning in 1586. Douglas described his exile in his memoir.

The 17th-century historian David Hume of Godscroft relates that Agnes Leslie wrote to her husband saying she would prevent their son Robert from joining him at the Lords Enterprisers attempt to take Stirling Castle in 1584, saying it was a foolish work that would ruin them. William replied that their course was honourable, and intended for the good of the church, and he trusted in providence. Robert and their son-in-law Laurence Oliphant were banished to France despite their mother's efforts, and were lost at sea in a battle with "Hollanders" or pirates.

In 1586, the attainder on the Morton earldom was reversed and the title returned to the 4th earl's family. By the 4th earl's will, on the death of Archibald Douglas, 8th Earl of Angus in 1588, William Douglas succeeded to the earldom of Morton, which brought him additional lands and houses including Dalkeith Palace, Aberdour Castle, Auchterhouse and Drochil Castle. In May 1590 he hosted the Danish Admiral Peder Munk at the Newhouse of Lochleven. Munk had been at Falkland Palace to accept the property as part of the dowry of Anne of Denmark.

In August 1592 the court was at Dalkeith Palace. Margaret Winstar, a Danish servant of Anne of Denmark, helped her lover, the rebel John Wemyss of Logie escape from the palace. James VI was angry and held a council. He sent Morton and Sir Robert Melville to the queen to demand she sent Winstar back to Denmark. The queen refused to speak to them.

== Autobiographical memoir ==
William Douglas wrote a short history of the Scottish reformation and reigns of Mary and James VI briefly mentioning the Siege of Leith, the Battle of Carberry Hill, the murder of David Rizzio, and the Ruthven Raid. The manuscript is held by the National Records of Scotland. Douglas wrote that he offered Rizzio £5,000 to prevent the forfeit of the Earl of Moray. He included prayers of thanks for the reformation of the Scottish church.

== Marriage and children ==
On 26 November 1554 he married Lady Agnes Leslie, Countess of Morton (born after 1541-died ca. 1606), the daughter of Agnes Somerville and George Leslie, 4th Earl of Rothes and as a direct descendant of King James II in her maternal line. The contract for their marriage was signed on 19 August 1554. The couple made their home at Lochleven Castle, which was a fortress situated on an island in the middle of the loch, and where his widowed mother also resided.

Sir William and Agnes together had eleven children:

- Christian Douglas, married firstly Laurence, Master of Oliphant, (lost at sea in March 1585) by whom she had issue; she married secondly Alexander Home, 1st Earl of Home.
- Robert Douglas, Master of Morton, (lost at sea in March 1585), married Jean Lyon of Glamis, by whom he had two sons, including William Douglas, 7th Earl of Morton. In 1585 it was rumoured that Laurence Oliphant and Robert had been killed by pirates or drowned. Later it was thought they were slaves in Algiers. In 1601, Robert Oliphant went to Algiers to look for his kinsman, carrying a letter of introduction to Sultan Mehmed III written by Queen Elizabeth, who also recommended her ambassador John Wroth help the search.
- James Douglas, Commendator of Melrose, who attended James VI in Denmark. He married firstly Mary Kerr, by whom he had issue; secondly Helen Scott, by whom he had issue; and thirdly Jean Anstruther, by whom he had issue.
- Sir Archibald Douglas of Kilmour (died 1649). He travelled with King James to Oslo to meet Anne of Denmark in 1589. He married Barbara Forbes (born 31 January 1560), by whom he had one son.
- Sir George Douglas of Kirkness (died December 1609), married Margaret Forrester.
- Euphemia Douglas, married Sir Thomas Lyon of Auldbar, Master of Glamis.
- Agnes Douglas, Countess of Argyll (1574- 3 May 1607), on 24 July 1592 married at Dalkeith, as his first wife, Archibald Campbell, 7th Earl of Argyll, the son of Colin Campbell, 6th Earl of Argyll and Agnes Keith, by whom she had one son and two daughters.
- Elizabeth Douglas, married in 1590 Francis Hay, 9th Earl of Erroll, by whom she had issue.
- Jean Douglas.
- Mary Douglas, married Sir Walter Ogilvy, 1st Lord Ogilvy of Deskford, by whom she had issue.
- Margaret Douglas, who married Sir John Wemyss of Wemyss in 1574.

Agnes's seven daughters were said to have been so beautiful that they were known as "the pearls of Lochleven". When Mary, Queen of Scots, was imprisoned at Lochleven Castle, some of them slept in her bedchamber for extra security.

In 1586, the earldom of Morton which had been forfeited in 1581 following the execution and attainder of the 4th Earl of Morton for being one of Henry Stuart, Lord Darnley's murderers, returned to the Douglas family. In 1588, upon the death of Archibald Douglas, 5th Earl of Morton, Sir William became the 6th Earl of Morton. From that time onward Agnes was styled the Countess of Morton. Sir William received the charter for the earldom on 20 July 1589.

William died sometime around the year 1606, which was the same year his wife died.

== Notes ==
Peerage of Scotland
Preceded by Archibald Douglas	Earl of Morton; 1588–1606	Succeeded by William Douglas
