= John Erskine, 5th Lord Erskine =

Scottish noble and diplomat (1487–1555)

John Erskine, 5th Lord Erskine (7 July 1487 – 11 November 1555) was a Scottish nobleman.

He was the son of Robert Erskine, 4th Lord Erskine (died 1513) and Isabel Campbell, a daughter of George Campbell of Loudon.

His family was claimant to the earldom of Mar; this was recognized in 1565 for his son, John. Following a dynastic dispute in the 19th century, John Lord Erskine was acknowledged, retrospectively, as the 17th Earl.

== Career ==
On 3 August 1522, Erskine was appointed keeper of the ten-year-old King James V of Scotland and Stirling Castle. He had strict instructions from Margaret Tudor to hold the castle keys and set a password every night for the King's guards. The instructions were given again by act of the Parliament of Scotland in 1523.

In 1533 Lord Erskine was paid for work building new park and garden ditches and dykes at Stirling Castle.

In 1535 he travelled to England to collect the collar of Order of the Garter from Henry VIII of England on behalf of James V. The ceremony took place at Windsor Castle and later Erskine met Henry VIII at Thornbury Castle. James V had given Lord Erskine a detailed instruction about his precedence in the Garter Chapel;

"Ye shall purchase to have the place was promised to us next to the King of France amongst kings, and failing thereof that ye take documents to fulfill for our part and leave it so."

Erskine returned to London where Cromwell's servant John Gostwyk gave him a gift of silver plate, £20 to his companion the Lyon King of Arms, David Lyndsay, and 80 crowns to the Rothesay Herald.

John Erskine was also a commissioner for the marriage negotiations of James V and Mary of Bourbon. After James married Madeleine of Valois, Mar took receipt of Dunbar Castle, which was formerly garrisoned by John Stewart, Duke of Albany for France.

Erskine returned to England with the Bishop of Orkney and James Learmonth of Dairsie for talks with the Duke of Norfolk at York on 17 September 1542. They discussed plans for a meeting between Henry VIII and James V and Scotland's continuing "auld alliance" with France.

== Marriage and family ==
John Erskine married Lady Margaret Campbell, daughter of Archibald Campbell, 2nd Earl of Argyll and Elizabeth Stewart.

Their daughter Margaret Erskine was a mistress of King James V of Scotland and the mother of Regent Moray, she later married Robert Douglas of Lochleven.

Lord Erskine died soon after November 1555. He was succeeded as Lord Erskine by his son John, who was later made Earl of Mar by Queen Mary in 1565.

Children of John Erskine, 5th Lord Erskine and Lady Margaret Campbell include;

- John Erskine, Earl of Mar (d. 1572)
- Robert Erskine, Master of Erskine, father of David Erskine, Commendator of Dryburgh
- Thomas Erskine, Master of Erskine, diplomat, and father of Adam Erskine, Commendator of Cambuskenneth
- Sir Alexander Erskine of Gogar
- Catherine Erskine, who married Alexander Elphinstone, 2nd Lord Elphinstone
- Margaret Erskine.
- Arthur Erskine of Blackgrange (d. 1571), master stabler to Mary, Queen of Scots, who married Magdalen Livingstone.

Peerage of Scotland
| Preceded by Robert Erskine | Lord Erskine; 1555–1572 | Succeeded by John Erskine |
