= Andrew Leslie, 5th Earl of Rothes =

Scottish Earl

The Right Honourable The Earl of Rothes
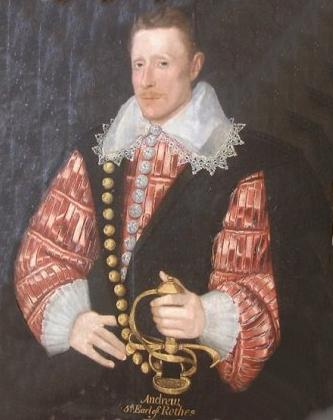
- Miniature of Lord Rothes

Personal details
- Born: Andrew Leslie; Before 1541
- Died: 1611
- Spouse: Grizel Hamilton (after 1547)
- Children: James Leslie, Master of Rothes; Patrick Leslie, 1st Lord Lindores; Eupheme Lindsay, Lady Lindsay
- Parent(s): George Leslie, 4th Earl of Rothes; Agnes Somerville
- Relatives: Norman Leslie (brother); John Leslie, 6th Earl of Rothes (grandson)

Andrew Leslie, 5th Earl of Rothes (before 1541 – 1611) was a Scottish nobleman.

== Early life ==
He was the son of George Leslie, 4th Earl of Rothes, and his third wife Agnes Somerville, daughter of Sir John Somerville of Cambusnethan and Elizabeth Carmichael.

He succeeded his father as 5th Earl in 1558, as his elder half-brothers Norman Leslie and William Leslie had forfeited their rights by having been implicated in the murder of Cardinal Beaton in 1546.

== Career ==
Leslie took an active part with the Lords of the Congregation, first against the queen-mother, Mary of Guise, when she was regent of Scotland, and afterwards against Mary, Queen of Scots in opposing her marriage with Lord Darnley, and in being part of the plot to murder David Rizzio. He was, however, one of the peers who acquitted Bothwell of Darnley's murder, and went over to the side of the queen. He fought for her at the Battle of Langside.

As the Marian civil war continued, in April 1573, Rothes negotiated for Regent Morton and the King's party with the "Castilians" William Kirkcaldy of Grange and Henry Echlin of Pittadro, who held Edinburgh Castle. Rothes continued to occupy a position of some prominence in Scottish affairs until his death in 1611.

== Personal life ==
In 1547, Leslie married Grizel Hamilton, daughter of Sir James Hamilton of Finnart and wife Margaret Livingston of Easter Wemyss. A dispensation was required for the marriage, which cost Regent Arran £20 and he paid a dowry of £1,333 Scots. Their children included three sons and two daughters:

- James Leslie, Master of Rothes, who married Hon. Margaret Lindsay, only daughter of Patrick Lindsay, 6th Lord Lindsay, but predeceased his father.
- Patrick Leslie (d. 1608), who was the 1st Lord Lindores; he married Jean Stewart, a daughter of Robert Stewart, 1st Earl of Orkney (a natural son of King James V of Scotland by Euphemia Elphinstone).
- Andrew Leslie of Rothes.
- Eupheme Leslie, who married James Lindsay, 7th Lord Lindsay, the only son of the 6th Lord Lindsay, in 1573.
- Elizabeth, who married first to David, son and heir of Sir John Wemyss, and secondly to James Ogilvy, 1st Earl of Findlater.

By his second wife, Jean Ruthven, daughter of Patrick Ruthven, 3rd Lord Ruthven, and relict of Henry Stewart, 2nd Lord Methven, he had two daughters:

- Margaret Leslie, who married Sir William Cunningham of Caprington.
- Mary Leslie, who married Robert Melville, 1st Lord Melville of Raith.

By his third wife, Janet Durie, daughter of David Durie of Durie, Fifeshire and Catherine Douglas (a daughter of Sir Robert Douglas of Lochleven), he had three sons and one daughter:

- George Leslie of Newton, died without issue.
- Sir John Leslie of Newton.
- Robert Leslie.
- Isabella Leslie, who married James Sinclair, Master of Sinclair, eldest son of Henry Sinclair, 6th Lord Sinclair, and had issue.

As his eldest son and heir apparent died before him, he was succeeded in his titles by James's son, his grandson John Leslie.

Peerage of Scotland
Preceded by George Leslie	Earl of Rothes; 1558–1611	Succeeded by John Leslie
