= Margaret Erskine =

Mistress of Scottish King (1515–1572)

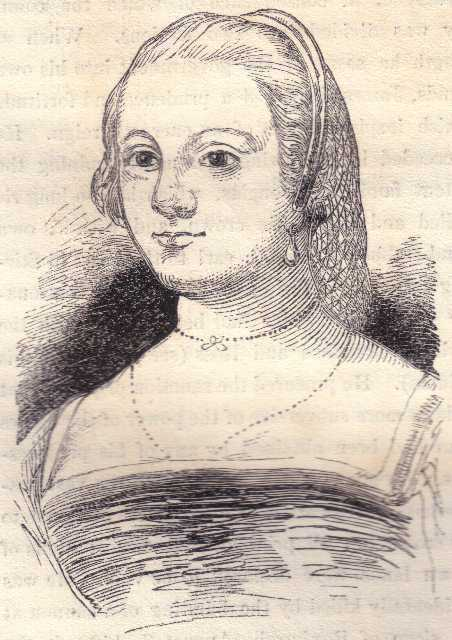

Lady Margaret Erskine was a Scottish landowner and potential royal bride of King James V of Scotland. She was also the mother of James Stewart, 1st Earl of Moray, who later served as Regent of Scotland.

She was a daughter of John Erskine, 5th Lord Erskine and Lady Margaret Campbell, daughter of Archibald Campbell, 2nd Earl of Argyll.

== Marriage to Robert Douglas ==
In 1522, Margaret Erskine was contracted to marry Robert Douglas of Lochleven, A reversion to the contract was recorded on 11 November 1527. The date of the marriage ceremony is not known. They had six children. Robert Douglas was killed in 1547 at the Battle of Pinkie.

== Relationship with James V ==
Margaret had one son with James V, likely in 1531 or 1532. A papal dispensation dated 30 August 1534 names four of the natural sons of James V, including Margaret Erskine's son, James Stewart, who is named and described as "junior" and in his third year. James Stewart was named in the register of the Great Seal on 28 October 1534 as Margaret's son. In August 1536, as the natural son (filio naturali) of James V and Margaret Erskine, James Stewart was granted an income from the lands of Tantallon Castle.

On 1 March 1537/38, James V wrote to Paul III mentioning that Margaret's son James Stewart was "now in his seventh year." After his 1562 marriage, James Stewart became the Earl of Moray, and served as Regent during the minority of James VI. Writing in the seventeenth century, Sir James Balfour recorded a later story that Margaret had dreamed of a lion and a dragon fighting in her womb before Moray's birth; he included it among the "vaine matters" then told about the regent.

== Rumours of a divorce ==
When James V was preparing to marry in 1536, some diplomats heard that Margaret Erskine might obtain a divorce and marry the King. James took some steps towards seeking permission for a divorce from the Pope. A courtier, James Hamilton of Finnart, was said to be involved in the project.

On 25 April 1536, the English ambassador William Howard reported to Henry VIII information supplied by Margaret Tudor and others;

Sire, I hear, both by the Queen's Grace your sister (Margaret Tudor) and diverse others that the marriage is broken between the King's Grace your nephew (James V) and the Monsieur de Vendôme, and he will marry a gentlewoman in Scotland, the Lord of Erskine's daughter, who was with your Grace the last summer at Thornbury; by whom he has had a child, having a husband (Robert Douglas), and his Grace has found means to divorce them. And there is great lamentation made for it in this country as far as men dare. Sire, there was no man made privy to this matter but Sir James Hamilton

In June 1536, the imperial ambassador in England, Eustache Chapuys, reported a rumour at court that James V wished to marry a woman with whom he already had a son. On 7 September 1536, Dr Pedro Ortiz reported to the Emperor Charles V that the King of Scots had married a woman who had previously been married and later separated from her husband on grounds of alleged consanguinity. Ortiz further reported that, during the separation, she had borne a son whom the king claimed as his own; according to Ortiz, the king sought papal recognition of the child as legitimate, but Pope Paul III had refused. The report names neither the woman nor the child.

By July 1536, Eustache Chapuys and Dr Ortiz understood that the Erskine marriage would not place and James V would marry a French bride. Charles, Bishop of Mâcon, reported that James denied intending to marry a subject and characterized the dispensation as imposture; Paul III replied that he had deferred action because he did not believe it had been made with James's knowledge. James V finalized his marriage contract with Madeleine of Valois on 26 November 1536.

During the Marian Civil War of the early 1570s, propaganda written by the anonymous "Tom Truth" against her son, James Stewart, alleged that Margaret Erskine had claimed she was contracted to marry James V. Such claims would make her son the king's heir.

== Life at Lochleven and the Newhouse ==
As a widow, Margaret Erskine managed the Lochleven estates until her son William Douglas came of age. Construction of the Newhouse of Lochleven on the mainland shore had begun around 1546. In 1552, acting as her husband's executor, Margaret Erskine made payments for work at the "placis of Lochlevyn and Newhous" including building stone "sett in the Newhous" and glazing at the Castle and the Newhouse. Later accounts associate the project with Margaret and their son, William Douglas, although responsibility for its initial construction is unclear. Kinross House was built on the site of Margaret's Newhouse.

During the war known as the Rough Wooing, three chests of valuables belonging to St Andrews Cathedral Priory were transferred to Lochleven Castle for safekeeping. They contained, among other objects, relics of Saint Andrew and valuable silk and gold vestments. After Robert Douglas's death at the Battle of Pinkie in 1547, Margaret Erskine and her son, James Stewart, returned all three chests to the priory, as recorded in a surviving receipt. The continuing war affected Margaret's income as key documents were moved away from Edinburgh for safety.

In 1558, Margaret joined James MacGill of Nether Rankeillour and the Edinburgh merchants James Adamson and James Barroun in guaranteeing letters of credit obtained from the Italian banker Timothy Cagnioli. The credit financed an embassy to Paris undertaken by her "derrest" son, James Stewart, in connection with the marriage of Mary, Queen of Scots, and the dauphin Francis.

Margaret retained the style "Lady of Lochleven" after her husband's death. In a deed dated 16 October 1560, she identified herself as "Margaret Erskyn, relict of umquhile Robert Douglass of Lochlevin" and signed "Margaret Erskyn, Lady of Lochlevin". In July 1564 she resigned the lands of Nether Friarton in Fife so her son the Earl of Moray could give them to William Kirkcaldy of Grange and his wife Margaret Learmonth. The transaction replaced a charter issued in 1560.

Shortly before the wedding of Queen Mary and Lord Darnley in 1565, Margaret's son, the Earl of Moray, stayed with her at Lochleven. The English ambassador Thomas Randolph reported that Moray was ill, and stayed in the "house in the Loch Leven, with his mother and his brother the laird of Lochleven". While Queen Mary was at Perth in June 1565, she granted lands at Easter and Wester Pitlethie (at Leuchars) to Margaret Erskine.

== Queen Mary at Lochleven ==
In June 1567, William Douglas of Lochleven was given custody of Mary, Queen of Scots. His wife was Agnes Leslie, Lady of Lochleven. In a letter of 1 May 1568 to Catherine de' Medici, Mary described the close surveillance under which she was kept at Lochleven, writing that she had leisure only during her keeper's dinner or while they slept, for "their daughters sleep with me.

Mary escaped from Lochleven Castle later that month. Margaret's son George Douglas was involved in the escape. James Melville of Halhill later wrote in his Memoirs that Margaret Erskine, George's mother, the "auld lady, his mother was thocht to be upon the consaill", reporting a contemporary belief that Margaret had been involved.

A manuscript version of David Hume of Godscroft's historical account subsequently attributed Mary’s escape partly to the connivance of "old Lady Lochleven". A contemporary report attributed the sabotage of other boats to a servant who assisted Mary's escape, without mentioning Margaret.

Godscroft noted that some previous writers thought she had no foreknowledge of the escape, while others thought "she had a hand in it", claiming that Margaret took pity on the Queen because she had promised to pardon her allies and give preferment to her younger son George Douglas.

=== Nau's narrative ===
Claude Nau, Mary's secretary, later wrote a narrative of Queen Mary's life. He referred to Margaret as "la vielle dame de Lokleving", (the old Lady Lochleven). He wrote that soon after Mary came to Lochleven, Margaret Erskine reported the actions of Lord Ruthven, who was appointed as one of the lords in charge of Mary's detention at Lochleven. According to Nau, Ruthven secretly made an offer to Queen Mary for her freedom. When Mary showed Margaret a letter from Ruthven, she told her son, William Douglas, Laird of Lochleven. After this, according to Nau, Ruthven was no longer involved in Mary's custody.

Nau wrote that Margaret gave Mary counsel against escaping. When George Douglas intended to go to France, Margaret tried to persuade him to make his peace with Mary's half-brother Regent Moray. Nau claimed that Margaret advised Queen Mary not to escape, trusting that in time she and Moray would be reconciled and come to a good understanding. According to Nau, Mary talked with Margaret Erskine, the "old lady", in the garden of Lochleven Castle before supper on the day of the escape.

== Later years ==
In her final years, Margaret Erskine looked after her granddaughters at the Newhouse of Lochleven and kept up a correspondence with their mother, Agnes Keith, Countess of Moray. In an undated letter from the Newhouse, Margaret informed Agnes Keith of the death of her daughter Annabel, describing her granddaughter as "your doichtor my bairne" and expressing profound grief. She recounted the child's illness and reported the post-mortem examination which discovered damage to her lungs.

Agnes Keith sent gifts of "aqua vitae" to Margaret, a distilled spirit akin to whisky. In January 1570, Margaret wrote that Loch Leven was frozen, and her son, William, was in the "Loich", the old castle on the lake island, because he was guarding Thomas Percy, 7th Earl of Northumberland. Northumberland had come to Scotland as a fugitive from the Rising of the North. In June 1571, Margaret described her poor health and complained that Agnes Keith had not visited;

Ye sall onderstand that I have beyne wery extreme seik baith in my bodye and stomak, and with ane sair leg, quhairoff (I) am nocht throichlie conwelleseit as yett, ... I wald skarslie have belevit ye would have bene neir (at) hand and veseit me nocht, and frindis heir

You shall understand that I have been very extreme sick, both in my body and stomach and with a sore leg, whereof I am not thoroughly convalesced as yet, ... I would scarcely have believed you would have been near at hand and visited me not, and friends here.

== Family ==
Margaret Erskine's children with Sir Robert Douglas included:

- William Douglas, 6th Earl of Morton, who was named as Robert Douglas's son and apparent heir by 20 January 1540/41.
- Robert Douglas, who was sent to England and Cambridge University in 1560 as a hostage for the Treaty of Berwick. He married Christina Stewart, 4th Countess of Buchan and was the father of James Douglas, 5th Earl of Buchan.
- George Douglas of Helenhill.
- Henry Douglas of Muckhart, who married Agnes Ramsay.
- Euphemia Douglas, who married Patrick Lindsay, 6th Lord Lindsay.
- Janet Douglas, who married Sir James Colville of Easter Wemyss.
- Catherine Douglas, who married David Durie.
