= Balgonie Castle =

Castle in Fife, Scotland

- Milton of Balgonie, Fife, Scotland; GB grid reference NO313007
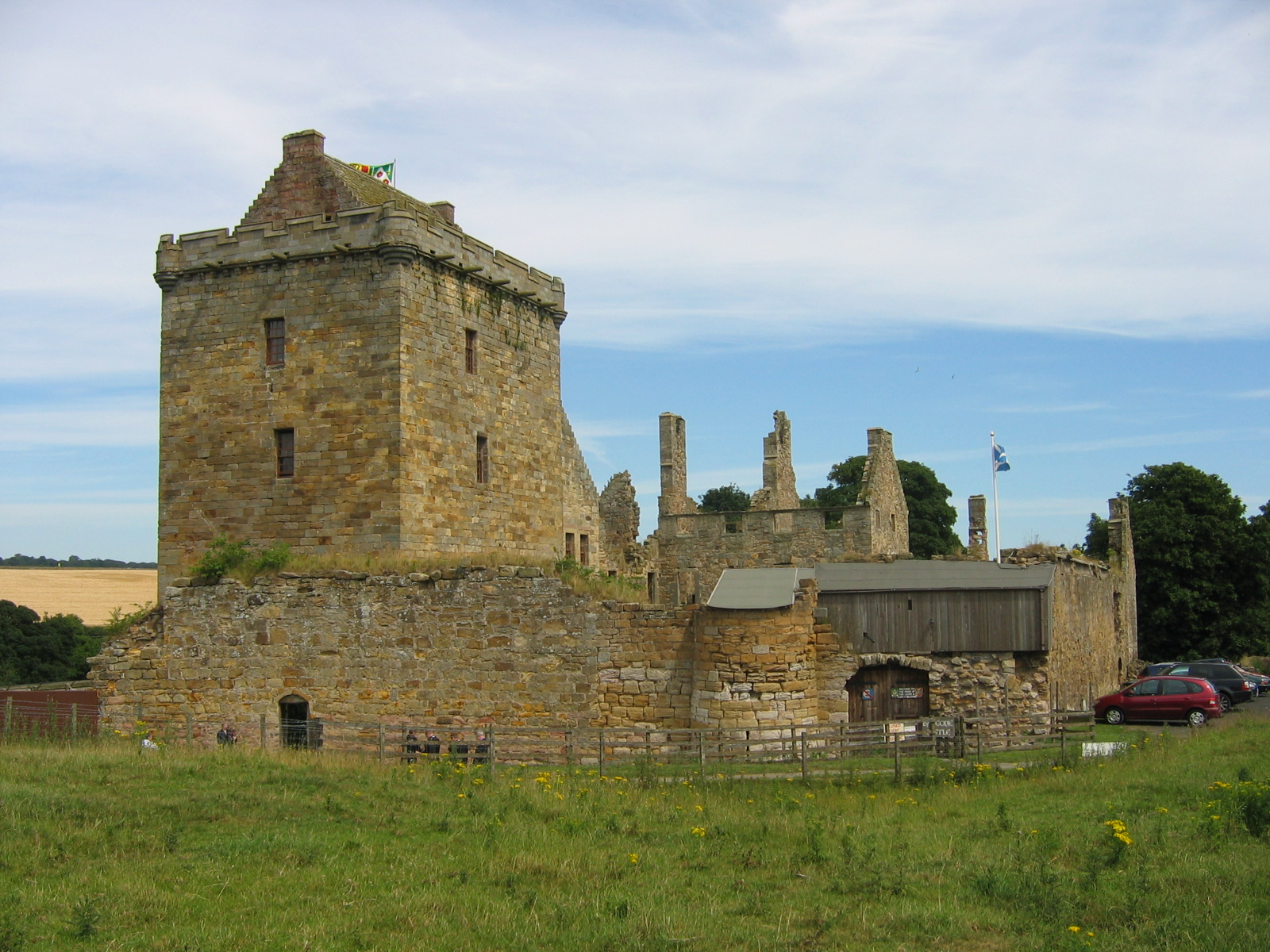
- Balgonie Castle seen from the south west, with the original tower house on the left

Site information
- Owner: Raymond Stanley Morris, Laird of Balgonie and Eddergoll and Stuart Morris of Balgonie and Eddergoll, yr.

Location
- Coordinates: 56.1938°N 3.1092°W

Site history
- Built: 1360s with later additions
- Built by: Sibbald family Sir Robert Lundie; Sir Alexander Leslie

Designations

Scheduled monument
- Official name: Balgonie Castle, artillery fortification
- Designated: 22 February 1996
- Reference no.: SM6411

Balgonie Castle is located on the south bank of the River Leven near Milton of Balgonie, 3.5 kilometres (2.2 mi) east of Glenrothes, Fife, Scotland. The castle keep dates from the 14th century, and the remaining structures were added piecemeal until the 18th century. The keep has been recently restored, although other parts of the castle are roofless ruins. Balgonie, excepting the tower which is used for residential purposes, is a Scheduled Ancient Monument. This castle is the subject for several ghostlore stories, including a green lady story.

== History ==
The lands of Balgonie were held by the Sibbalds from at least 1246. Probably in the 1360s, the Sibbalds built a barmkin, or fortified courtyard, with a tower house at the north-west corner. The lands and the castle were left to a daughter, who married Sir Robert Lundie, who extended the castle in 1496, following his appointment as Lord High Treasurer of Scotland. Sir Robert built a two-storey range of buildings to the east of the keep, enlarging the accommodation with a long hall and a solar. This range incorporated an earlier corner tower and the 14th-century chapel. King James IV visited Balgonie on 20 August 1496, and gave 18 shillings to the masons as a gift.

In 1627 the castle was sold to the Boswells, who sold it on in 1635 to Sir Alexander Leslie, a Scottish soldier who had fought for the Swedish army during the Thirty Years' War (1618–1648), rising to the rank of Field Marshal, and who led the Covenanters during the Scottish Bishops Wars. Leslie was created Lord Balgonie and Earl of Leven in 1641, and finally retired in 1654. He carried out further improvement of his home, adding a two-storey building at the south-east corner of the courtyard.

The initials FSAL and DAR, for Field Marshal Sir Alexander Leslie, and his wife Dame Agnes Renton, were found inscribed within the south-east block, suggesting that this was built prior to Leslie's elevation to the peerage. He also rebuilt the late 15th century north range with an extra storey, and laid out a park around the castle, remnants of which remain.

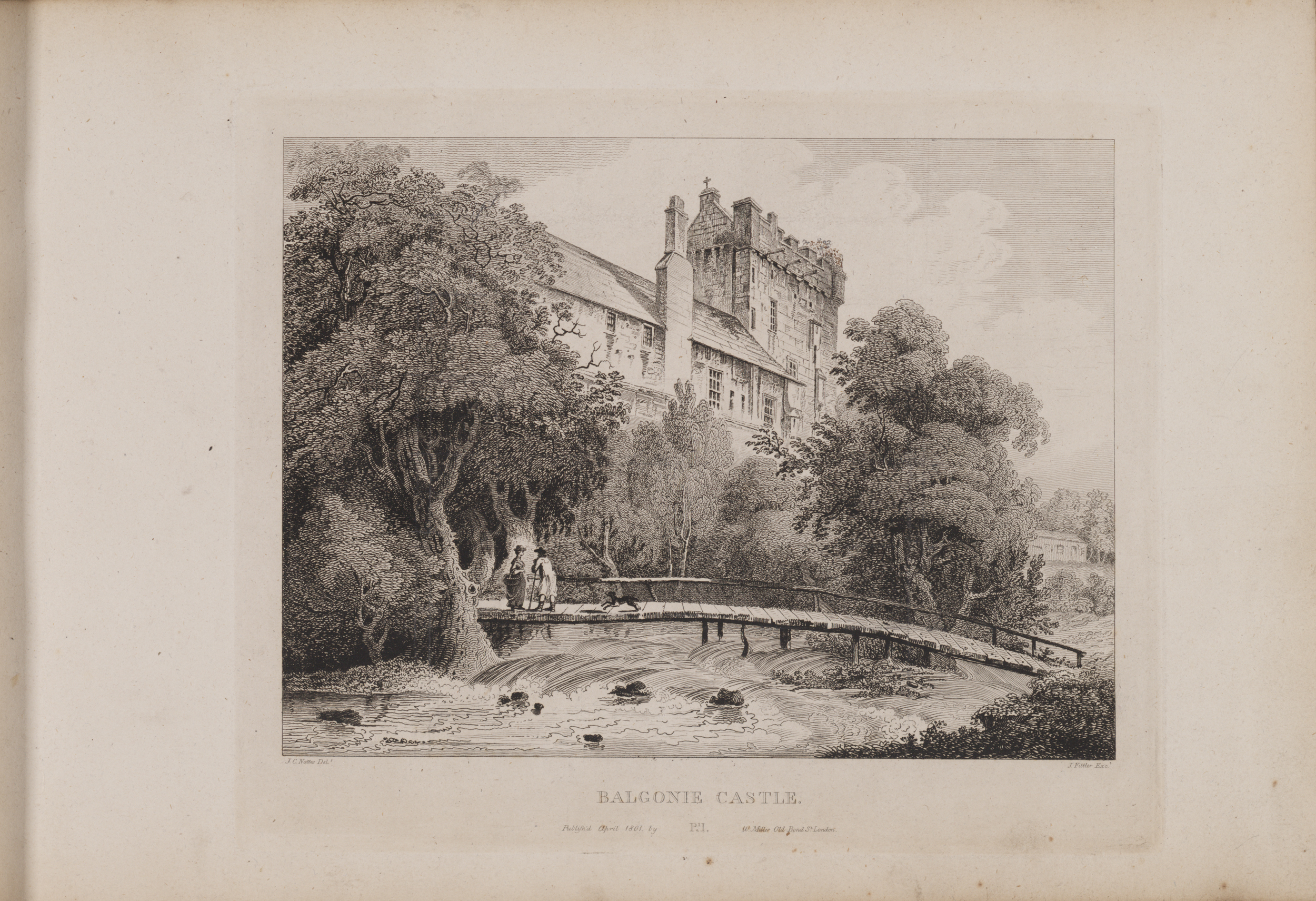
Etching of the castle by James Fittler from Scotia Depicta, published 1804

The next additions were carried out by John Leslie, 7th Earl of Rothes, who disputed the earldom of Leven with David Melville following the death of the second earl in 1664. Lord Rothes, with the aid of John Mylne junior, the king's master mason, built a grand stair linking the keep and north range, where previously a wooden bridge stood. On his death in 1681 David Melville inherited Balgonie, along with the earldom of Leven. He too added a range of buildings in 1706, this time a three-storey section linking the north range with the south-east block. The work was completed by master mason Gilbert Smith.

Rob Roy MacGregor captured Balgonie Castle during a raid in 1716, although the castle was soon returned to the Melvilles. David Melville, 6th Earl of Leven made minor improvements in the 1720s, including the insertion of sash windows. Further buildings were also added within the courtyard.

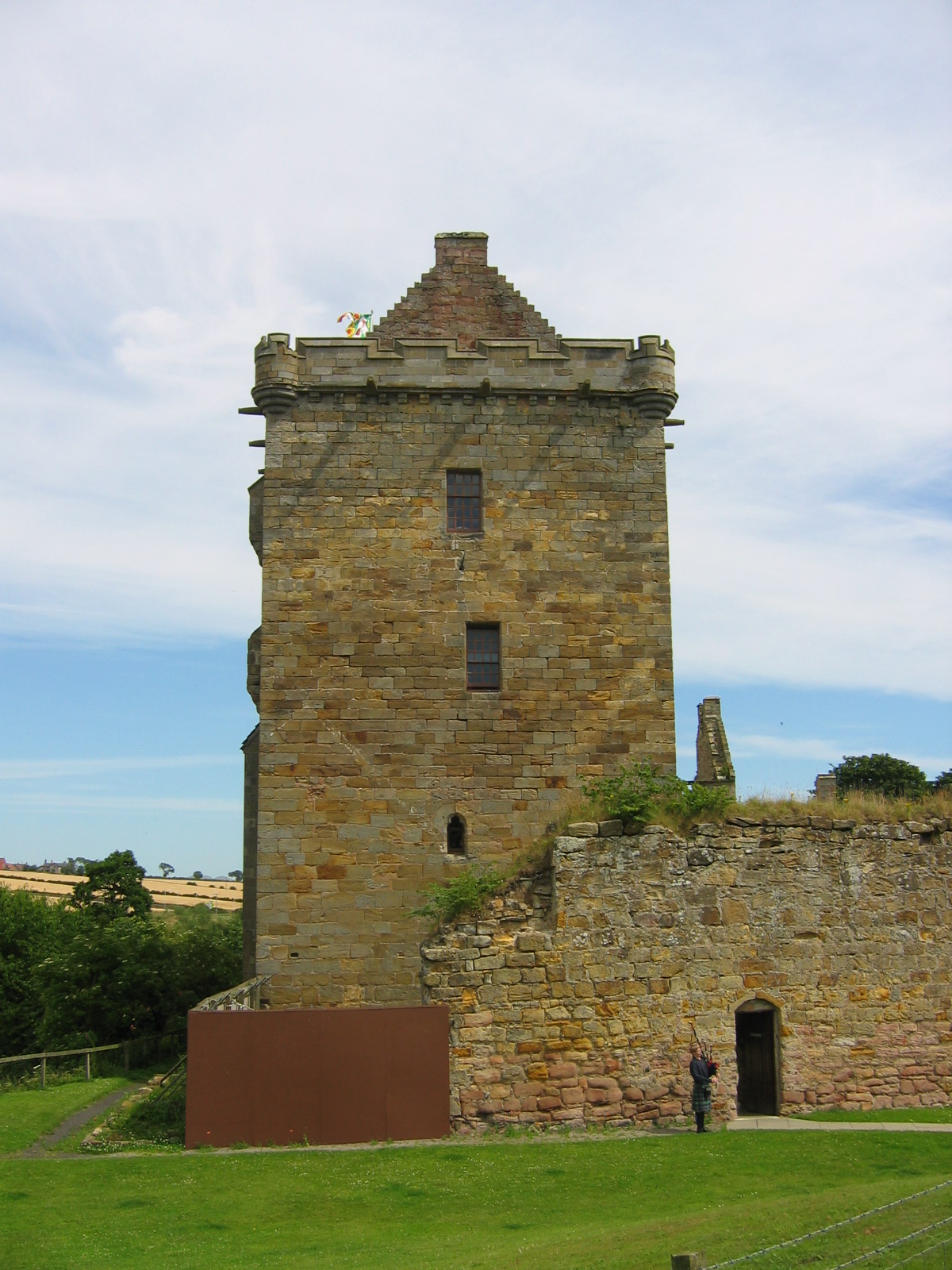
The west elevation of the tower house or keep

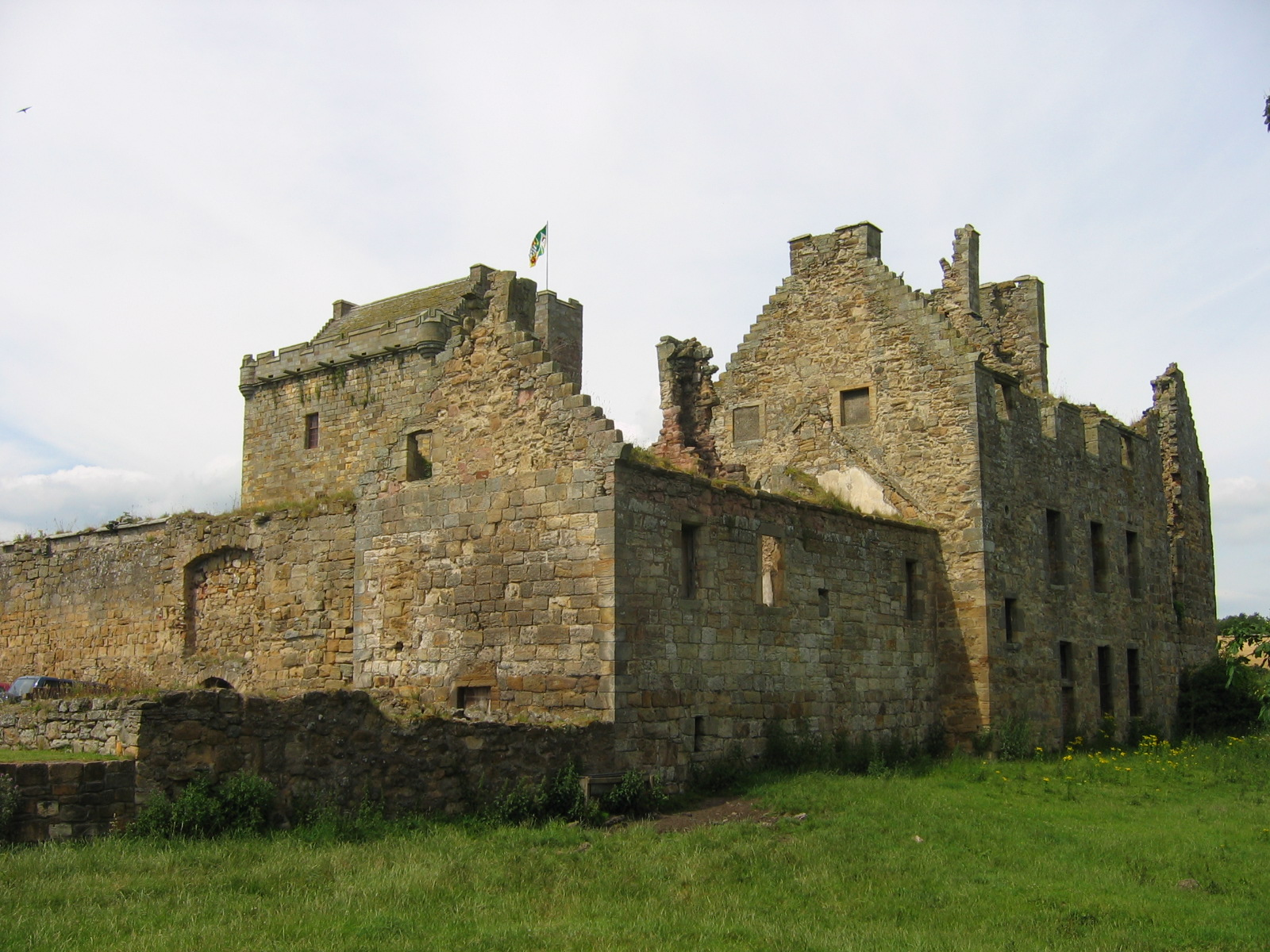
The roofless east range

In 1824 the castle was sold to James Balfour of Whittingehame, father of James Maitland Balfour, and grandfather of Arthur Balfour, who served as British Prime Minister from 1902 to 1905. He was unable to arrest the decay which was advancing, and in the mid nineteenth century the roofs were removed to avoid paying tax on the property. Much vandalism occurred in the 1960s, and it was not until 1971 that restoration of the castle, then owned by David Maxwell, began. Work continued through the 1970s and 1980s, aided by European funding as part of European Architectural Heritage Year, in 1975. The keep and chapel have now been fully restored, and the castle is once again occupied; its current owner is Raymond Morris, originally of Walsall, and his family. The castle is open to the public, and the restored chapel and great hall can be hired for events such as weddings. The owners have expressed their intent to continue the restoration of the entire building.

== Architecture ==
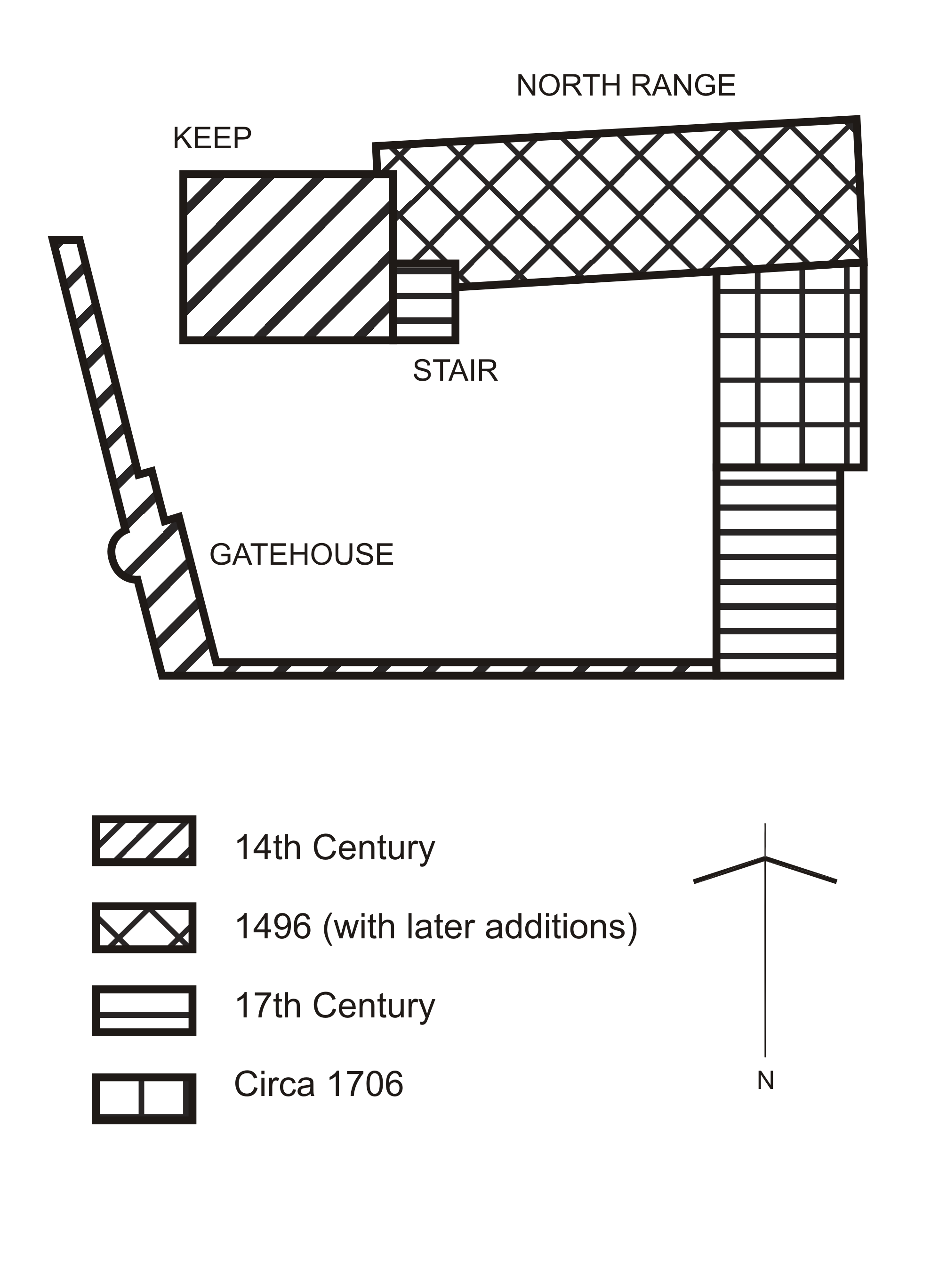
Plan of Balgonie Castle with approximate dates of construction

The castle is still entered via the 15th century gatehouse. This is semi-ruinous above ground level, but a guardroom and prison can be seen within. The gate opens onto a courtyard, containing a well, around which the buildings are arranged.

The ground and first floors of the keep are vaulted, the first floor containing the hall, which unusually had no great fireplace. This would originally have been entered via a moveable timber stair, prior to the construction of the present stone stair. Above the hall are two further floors, each with a fireplace and connected by a turnpike stair. The keep is topped by a pitched roof with crow stepped gables. Outside, the parapet walk and cannon spouts are of 17th-century origin, and contemporary with the enlarged windows. Some of the smaller trefoil-headed original windows survive.

In the basement of the north range is the vaulted chapel, although the remainder of the range, and the east buildings, are roofless. Walls and chimney stacks remain. The remains of earlier buildings within the courtyard were uncovered during excavations in 1978. It appears that these were demolished in the early 17th century to allow rebuilding.

Beyond the castle walls, the extensive boundary walls of the deer park survive, although damaged in parts. Large mature trees remain from the 17th century landscaping.

== Ghostlore ==
Several hauntings have been reported within the castle. One spectre, nicknamed 'Green Jeanie', is said to be the ghost of one of the Lundie occupants. A 17th-century soldier, a dog, and a hooded man have also been claimed to be seen. A skeleton was found in the floor of the great hall, during works in 1912.

== See also ==
- List of places in Fife
- Restoration of castles in Scotland
