= Robert Douglas of Lochleven =

Scottish courtier and landowner

Sir Robert Douglas of Lochleven (died 10 September 1547) was a Scottish courtier and landowner.

== Early life ==
Robert Douglas was the son of Thomas Douglas, younger of Lochleven, and Elizabeth Boyd, daughter of Archibald Boyd of Nariston and Bonshaw. His father predeceased his grandfather, Robert Douglas of Lochleven. By 31 May 1526, the younger Robert was styled "dominus feodi terrarum de Lochlevin ('Lord of the fee of the lands of Lochleven')" while his grandfather retained free tenement of the estate. Robert acted with tutors and curators, including his grandfather and John Erskine, Lord Erskine, whose assent was required for a grant of an annual rent from his lands of Keillor to the Dominican Friars of St. Andrews. Some of his estate papers survive, including his rental of Kinross, which records a dairy farm at Fossoway tenanted by Robert Kyd.

In July 1535, John Erskine, 5th Lord Erskine, was sent on a diplomatic mission to England and France. His tenants and several of his neighbours, including Robert Erskine of Lochleven, were requested to refrain from bringing any legal action or claim against him during his absence on royal service.

On 1 March 1535/36, James Beaton, Archbishop of St Andrews, granted Robert Douglas of Lochleven and his wife the teind sheaves of the churches of Kinross and Ureall, with the mill of Mukkart. The following year, on 15 March 1537/38, a summons was issued in the church of St Giles in Edinburgh, for confirmation of a feu of the lands of Cragfoid granted by the Abbot of Kinloss, Robert Reid, and the convent of Balmerino to Robert Douglas of Lochleven.

== Morton estates ==
On 17 October 1540, James Douglas, 3rd Earl of Morton resigned the earldom of Morton, the lordship of Dalkeith and associated lands into the hands of James V in favour of Robert Douglas of Lochleven, while reserving his own liferent.

Robert was infeft of the Morton estates, with instruments of his service in the lordship of Dalkeith recorded on 11 January 1540/41. On 20 January 1540/41, Robert was compelled to resign the Morton acquisition to the Crown at Falkland, protesting formally in writing both before and after that he acted unwillingly:

"vi ductus metuq[ue] mortis coactus ac timore amissionis antique sue hereditatis de Lochlevin … compulsus." [Led by force, compelled through fear of death and fear of loss of his ancient inheritance of Lochleven, for himself and his heirs in perpetuity]

On 20 January 1540/41, he received a separate Crown settlement of Kinross, Lochleven Castle and associated estates to himself in liferent and his son William in fee. In March, Robert undertook to resign Aberdour to the Crown when he was infeft in Tillicoultry.

On 17 December 1542, after James V's death, Robert renewed his protest regarding the Morton resignation, again maintaining that his participation had resulted from force, fear of death, and fear of losing his inheritance. Morton meanwhile sought reduction of the 1540 transactions, claiming that his own resignation had been obtained under coercion. In March 1542/43, Morton contracted with George Douglas of Pittendreich for the reduction of Robert's infeftment, and on 22 April 1543 created a new entail in favour of his daughter Elizabeth and her husband James Douglas of Pittendreich. The 1540 transaction was subsequently reduced by the Lords of Council and Session. On 30 June 1547, Robert Douglas agreed, for 5000 merks, to renounce his rights in favour of James Douglas, Master of Morton while preserving a contingent right should the lands later fall to Robert or his heirs under the entail. Although James Douglas of Pittendreich became the 4th Earl of Morton, Robert's son William Douglas of Lochleven ultimately succeeded the earldom of Morton on 4 August 1588.

== Later life ==
When James V died, Regent Arran sent James Kirkcaldy of Grange for three of James's sons who were "at the scole at Saint Andrewes". An English report does not name the boys. They can be identified as Robert Stewart (later Earl of Orkney), John Stewart (later Prior of Coldingham), and James Stewart (later Earl of Moray), Margaret Erskine's son. John Stewart and James Stewart were both formally matriculated at St. Andrews. The English report continues that Robert Douglas had taken his step-son from Grange's custody. A Scottish record relates that Robert Douglas had taken "her grace's brother James Stewart, commendator of the priory of St Andrews, forth of the said abbey".

The Lochleven estate accounts record a Beltane gathering at the Newhouse in 1546 involving tenants termed "bowmen", who held "bowtouns". Under Robert Douglas, Lochleven Castle underwent significant development in the 1540s. He built the Great Hall in the courtyard and was responsible for the development of New House on the Kinross shore. The Glassin Tower is dated to around 1550, identifying it as one of the final major works at the castle.

Robert Douglas was killed at the battle of Pinkie on 10 September 1547.

== Marriage and family ==
A marriage between Robert Douglas of Lochleven and one of John Erskine's daughters was being arranged in 1522. On 11 July 1522 at Alloa, Robert Douglas was contracted to marry Margaret Erskine. There was a reversion to the marriage contract on 11 July 1527. The date of the wedding has not been established. Margaret Erskine had a son with James V, James Stewart, 1st Earl of Moray, born in 1531 or 1532.

Robert Douglas and Margaret Erskine's children included:

- William Douglas, 6th Earl of Morton, who was named as Robert Douglas's son and apparent heir by 20 January 1540/41.
- Robert Douglas, who married Christina Stewart, 4th Countess of Buchan and was the father of James Douglas, 5th Earl of Buchan.
- George Douglas of Helenhill and Rungallie, gentleman and usher of the king's bedchamber in 1580 and envoy to France in 1581.
- Henry Douglas of Mukhart, who married Agnes Ramsey.
- Euphemia Douglas, who married Patrick Lindsay, 6th Lord Lindsay.
- Janet Douglas, who married Sir James Colville of Easter Wemyss (d. 1562).
- Catherine Douglas, who married David Durie.
