= Glengarnock =

Coordinates: 55.739°N 4.677°W

Glengarnock: Scottish Gaelic: Gleann Gairneig
- Location within North Ayrshire
- Council area: North Ayrshire
- Lieutenancy area: Ayrshire and Arran
- Country: Scotland
- Sovereign state: United Kingdom
- Post town: BEITH
- Postcode district: KA14, KA15
- Dialling code: 01505
- Police: Scotland
- Fire: Scottish
- Ambulance: Scottish
- UK Parliament: North Ayrshire and Arran
- Scottish Parliament: Cunninghame North

Glengarnock (Gaelic: Gleann Gairneig) is a small village in North Ayrshire that lies near the west coast of Scotland. It forms part of the Garnock Valley area and is about 18 miles (29 kilometres) from Glasgow, the nearest city. The Barony of Glengarnock is one of three baronies which together form the parish of Kilbirnie in the district of Cunningham which lies in north Ayrshire. The River Garnock flows through the village, but the name Glen Garnock applies more specifically to the ravine at Glengarnock Castle, some 4 kilometres (2 1/2 miles) north of the village.

== The River Garnock and Kilbirnie Loch ==
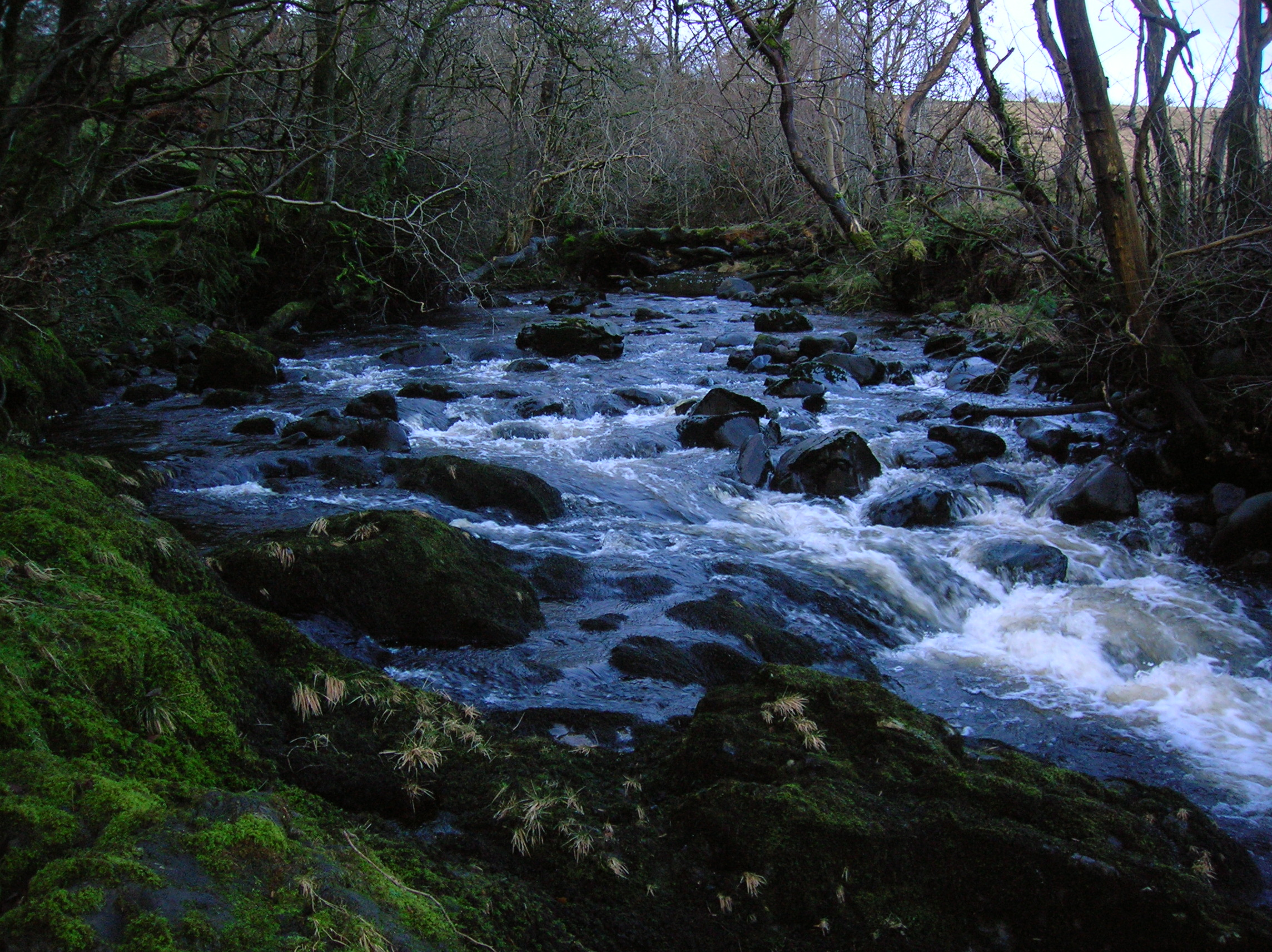
The Garnock's Waters near Glengarnock Castle.

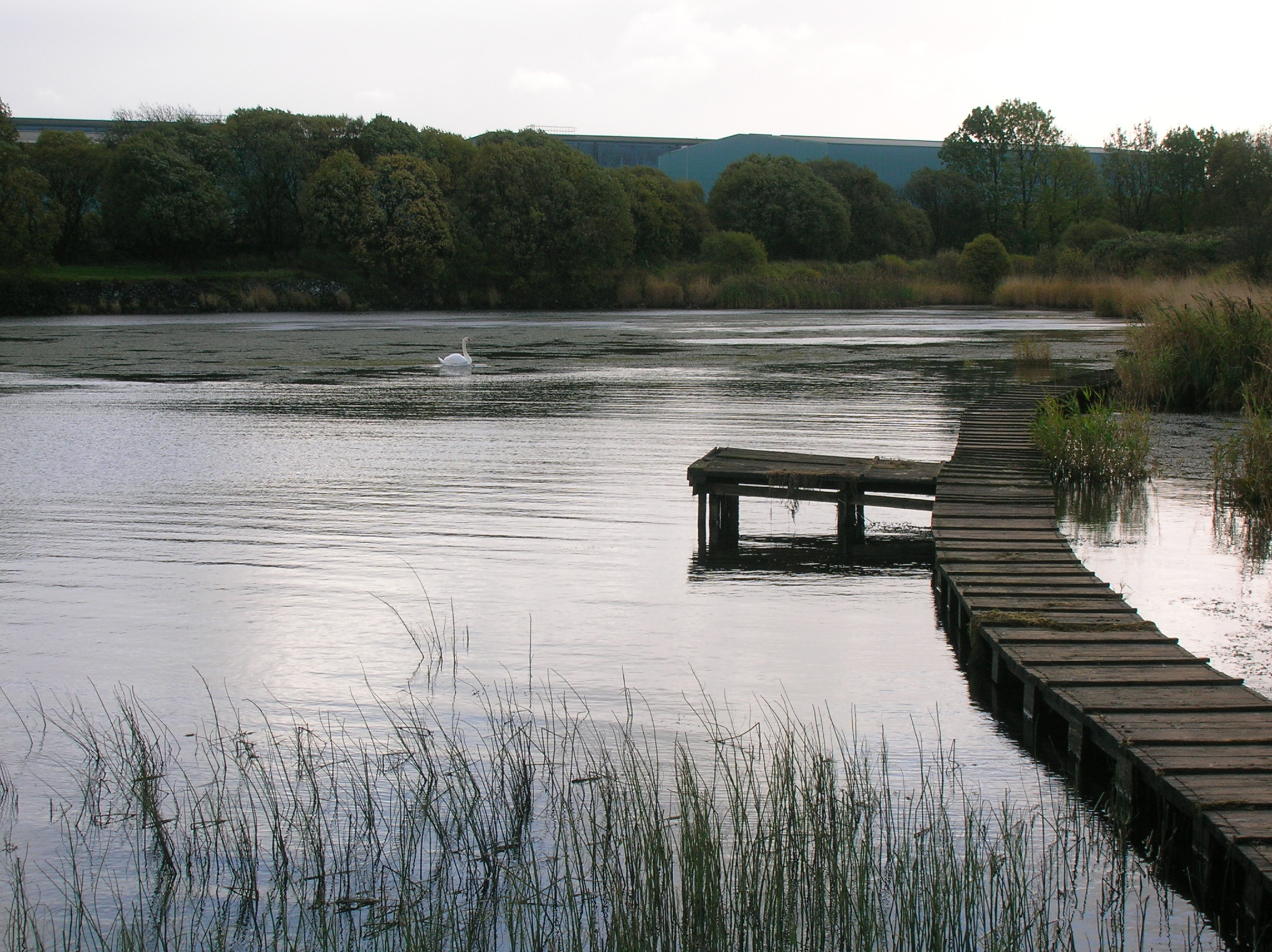
The southern end of Kilbirnie Loch.

The River Garnock runs through the village. It flows from the base of the Hill of Stake in a southerly direction, traversing Kilbirnie and Glengarnock, and making its way to Irvine Harbour where it enters the sea. The source of the River Garnock is in the Muirsheil Hills.

Kilbirnie Loch is situated nearby, however the River Garnock does not flow into it, although in the past it has been known to flood into it.

== Social history ==
Glengarnock is a small village in Northern Ayrshire that took its name from the original Barony of Glengarnock, and the medieval Glengarnock Castle whose ruins are still visible some 3 miles upstream and north of Kilbirnie. The community consisted of a number of migrant workers from Ireland and Lithuania who were brought in to man the works and housed in the "raws", i.e., rows of terraced cottages. A significant community existed with a number of local shops and facilities but these slowly dwindled when the community moved to better housing in Kilbirnie itself and by the 1970s had declined to only a small number of local shops.

One of the first libraries in North Ayrshire was formed by Mr William Rabey who opened a Reading room at the Steel Works.

Kilbirnie Ladeside F.C. lies close to Glengarnock and has its name derived from the lade running from the old Nether Mill.

== Industry ==
The main employment in the village came, historically, from the steelworks which existed on the shores of nearby Kilbirnie Loch. This, however, has been closed and the site is now home to various small businesses. During the course of its life, the Iron Works there were owned by Merry and Cunninghame, Colvilles, and British Steel, finally closing in the early nineteen-eighties. In 1892 Merry and Cunninghame's interest in Glengarnock had finished and Glengarnock Iron and Steel Co. was formed. From 1900 to 1914 there were periods of trade depression and when war was declared in 1914 the plant was idle. The Ministry of Munitions instructed them to produce munitions for the war. David Colville purchased the plant in 1916. Perhaps the 1930s was the first time people started to leave; economic depression and the means test which had been newly introduced left a lot of people poor, so they moved in the hope of better lives elsewhere. Riots were breaking out at that time. In 1978 the works, by then owned by the British Steel Corporation, employed just 200 people. Staff magazines from the entire period have been preserved and are held by the Mitchell Library in Glasgow. These throws an interesting light on the period. Ironically some of the buildings of the old steel works still lie empty on the site and one of them even has the Steel Works War Memorial still on the wall with names of the fallen during the two great wars, who were employees of the steel works. Poet Lorna J Waite wrote about the deep impact on people living there, in her work The Steel Garden Poems (2011).

Various industries and businesses are situated today at the Lochshore Industrial Estate and Glengarnock Business Park in Caledonian Road, and in the village itself.

== Transport ==
Glengarnock railway station on the Ayrshire Coast Line serves trains between Glasgow and Ayr, Ardrossan, or Largs.

== Religion ==
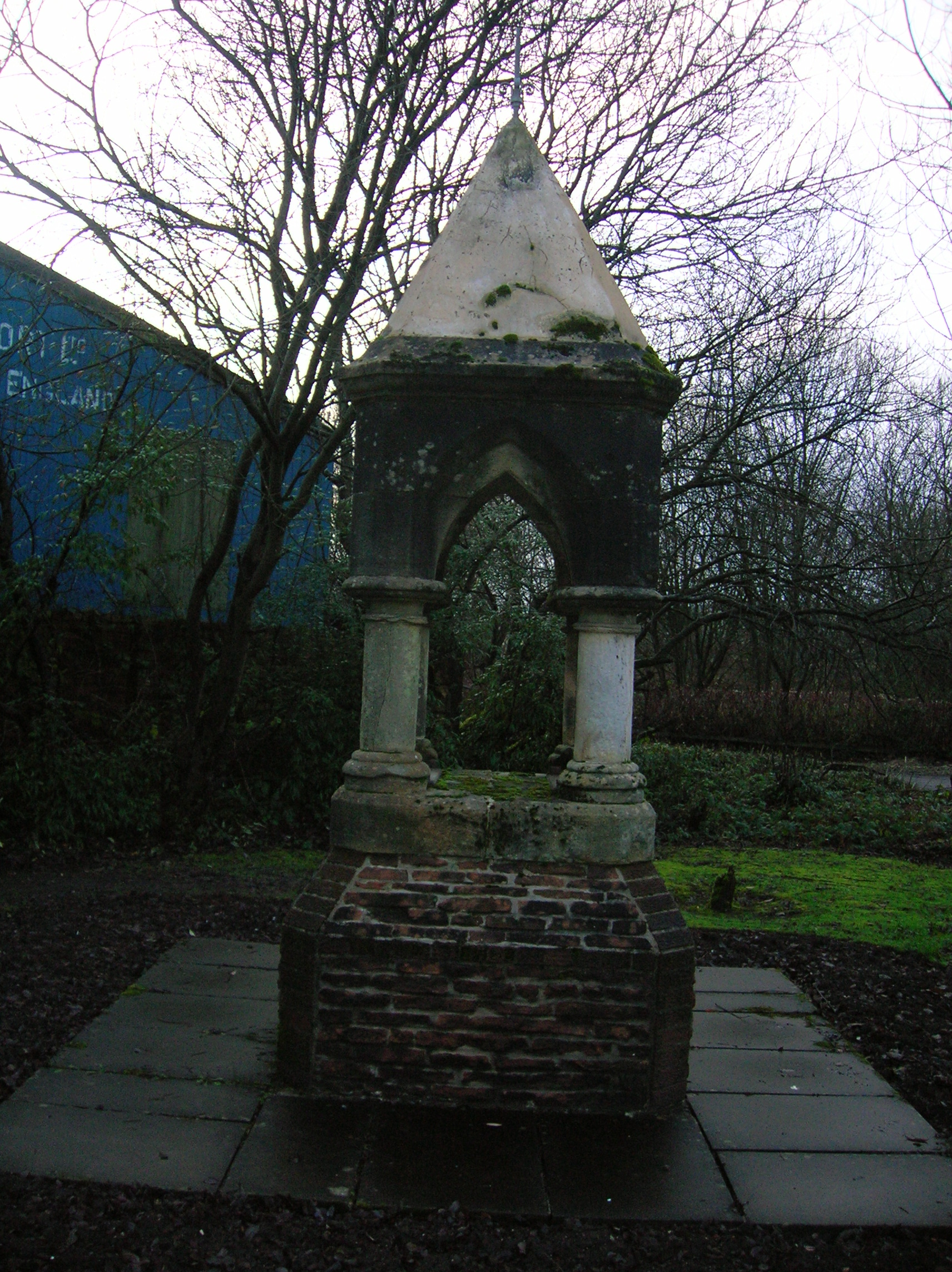
The memorial to Glengarnock church.

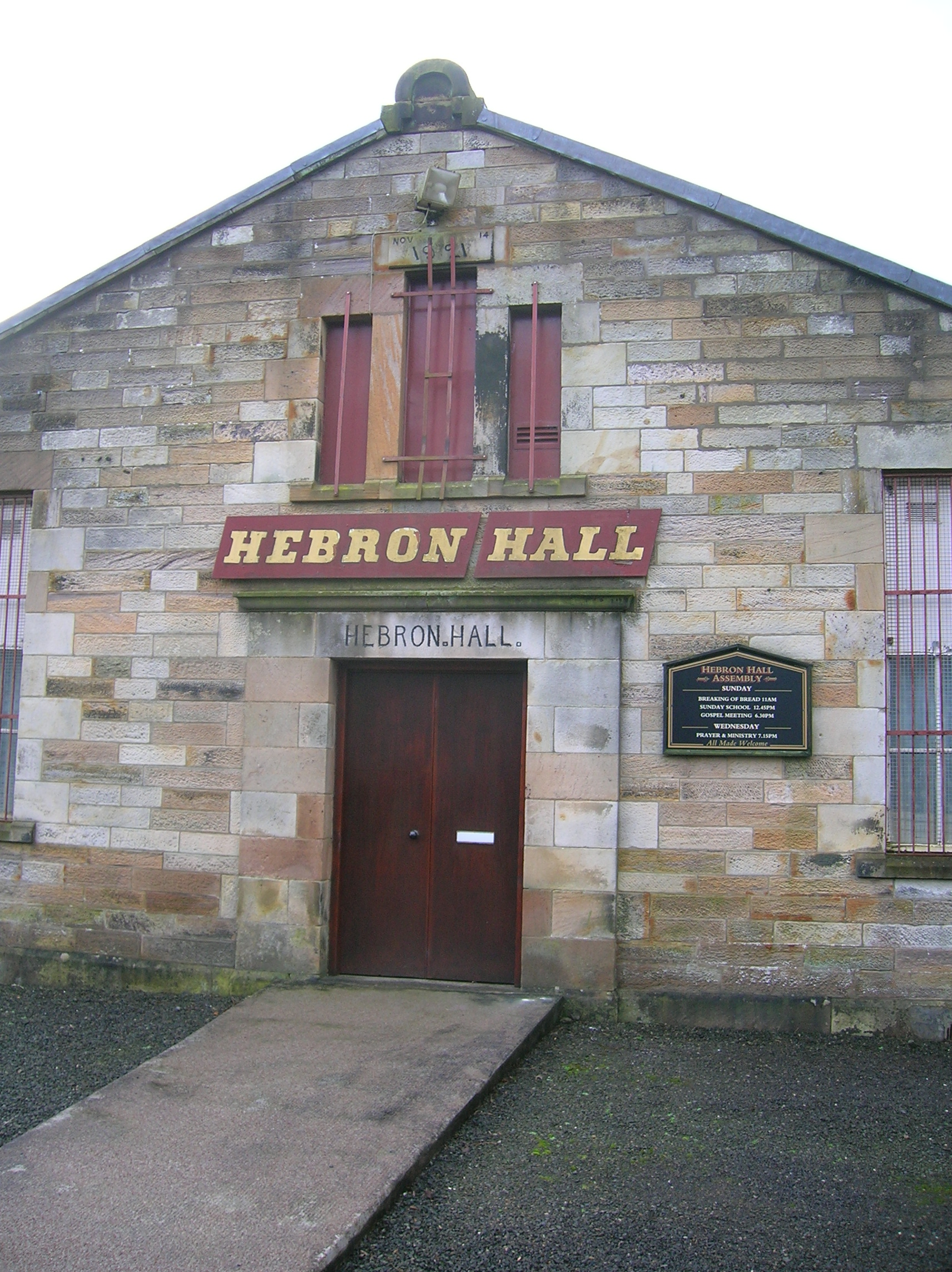
The Hebron Hall of the Plymouth Brethren. Note unusually the date and month on the 1921 opening stone.

Glengarnock Church has now been closed and demolished although the Manse remains as a private residence. A memorial to the Church in the form of the preserved steeple has been erected in the village main street. It was formed in 1870 composed of people from Kilbirnie Beith Dalry and of course the local folk. It was original United Presbyterian becoming United Free and eventually Glengarnock Parish Church. When it closed a time capsule was dug up, containing items of the time. It is held by the Auld Kirk of Kilbirnie.

Glengarnock also had a Jehovah's Witness meeting room as well as the "Hebron Hall" Plymouth Brethren assembly. Both have now closed.

The Hebron Hall Plymouth Brethren Assembly was opened in 1921. Previously "Duffield's Building" had been used, a building across from the old Glengarnock School. Then as the Assembly was formed, they met in the Orange Lodge Hall before the present hall.
