= Barony and Castle of Kilbirnie =

Barony and castle west of the town of Kilbirnie in North Ayrshire, Scotland

Kilbirnie Castle
- Kilbirnie, North Ayrshire, Scotland; UK grid reference NS30655083
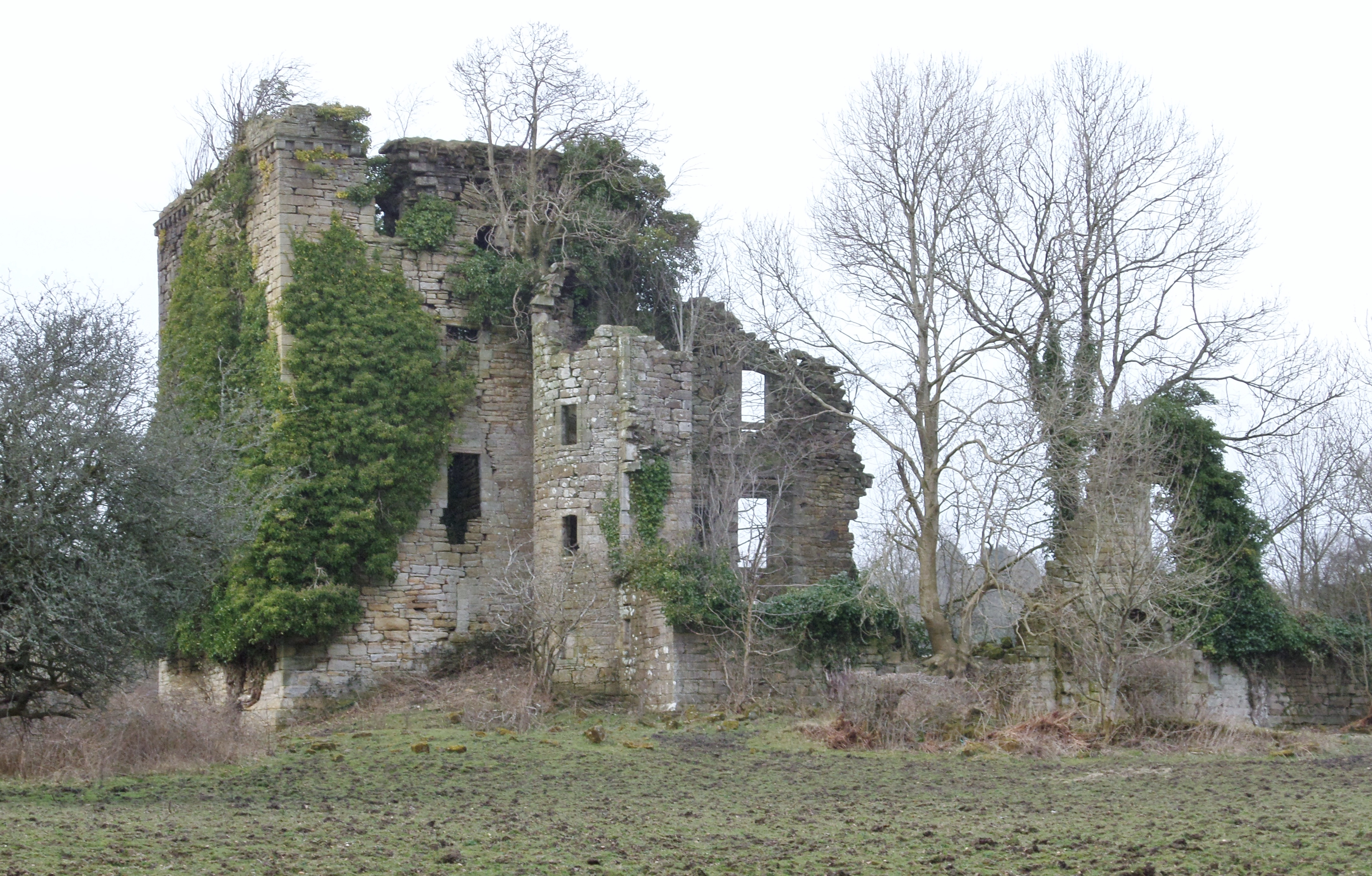
- Kilbirnie Castle

Site information
- Type: Tower and mansion house
- Owner: Coughlin Family
- Controlled by: Clans Barclay, Crawfurd, Lindsay, and Boyle
- Open to the public: No
- Condition: Ruined

Location
- Shown within Scotland
- Location within Scotland
- Coordinates: 55.750581°N 4.704525°W

Site history
- Built: 15th century and 17th century
- In use: Until 17th century
- Materials: Stone

The substantial remains of the old castle and sixteenth century manor house of Kilbirnie lie west of the town of Kilbirnie in North Ayrshire, Scotland, on the lower slopes of the Glengarnock Hills, in the old Barony of Kilbirnie. The building is also variously known as the Place of Kilbirnie, The Place, or Kilbirnie House.

The site lies close to a stream and small but deep ravine that once provided a defensive function for the castle site. The castle and manor house themselves are not in the grounds of the Kilbirnie Place Golf Club, which was itself laid out in 1925 on the old landscaped 'pleasure grounds' once attached to the castle site.

The OS maps show that a much later estate and house called Place was located nearby, built by the Knox family but now mostly demolished.

== History ==
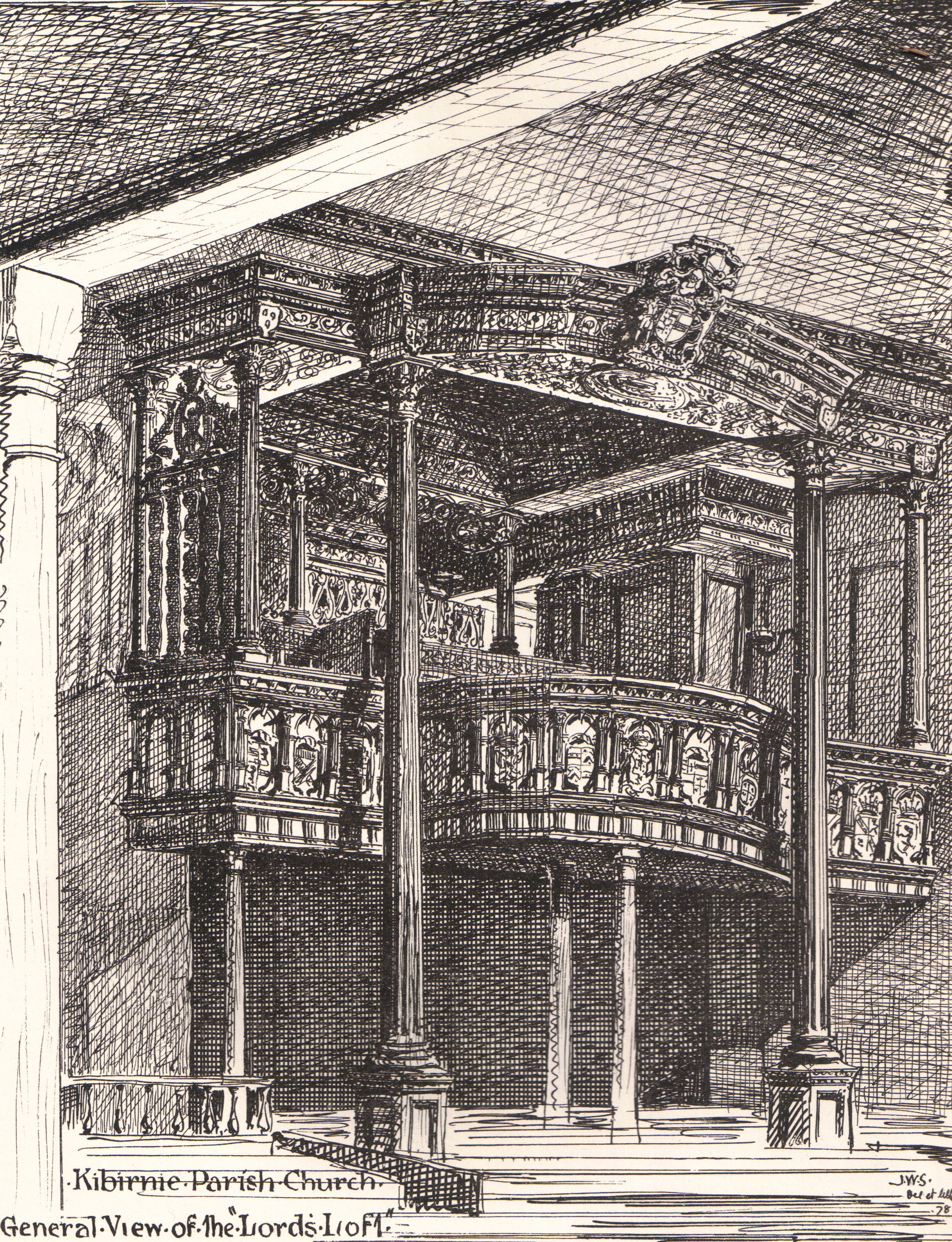
One of three "Lairds Lofts" at Kilbirnie parish church

The name "Kilbirnie" is derived from the Gaelic language, and means "Church of St Brendan". The parish was divided into three baronies: Kilbirnie, Ladyland, and Glengarnock. The feudal Barony of Kilbirnie was the largest in the parish at around 5500 acres and had the most fertile quarter with 3000 acres of arable, pasture and woodland.

Kilbirnie Castle is said to be the site where in 1263 the Scots mustered under Alexander III before fighting Norwegian forces in the Battle of Largs.

The castle's location is on high ground above the bend of a deep ravine, giving the site some protection along its west and north sides although it is set back from the edge of this ravine. The word place in Scots refers to a landed proprietor's mansion house, and is equivalent in meaning to the English word "palace", although the term "palace" acquired its present connotations at a much later date. The dwelling is clearly seen as being in two quite distinct parts: one a substantial defensive tower built in about 1470 for Malcolm Crawfurd and his wife, Marjory Barclay, an heiress and the last of her line; the other part is dated to 1627 and is a more comfortable dwelling with no significant defensive features. The entrance to the new 'wing' has a very unusual and prominent projecting porch on the south front.

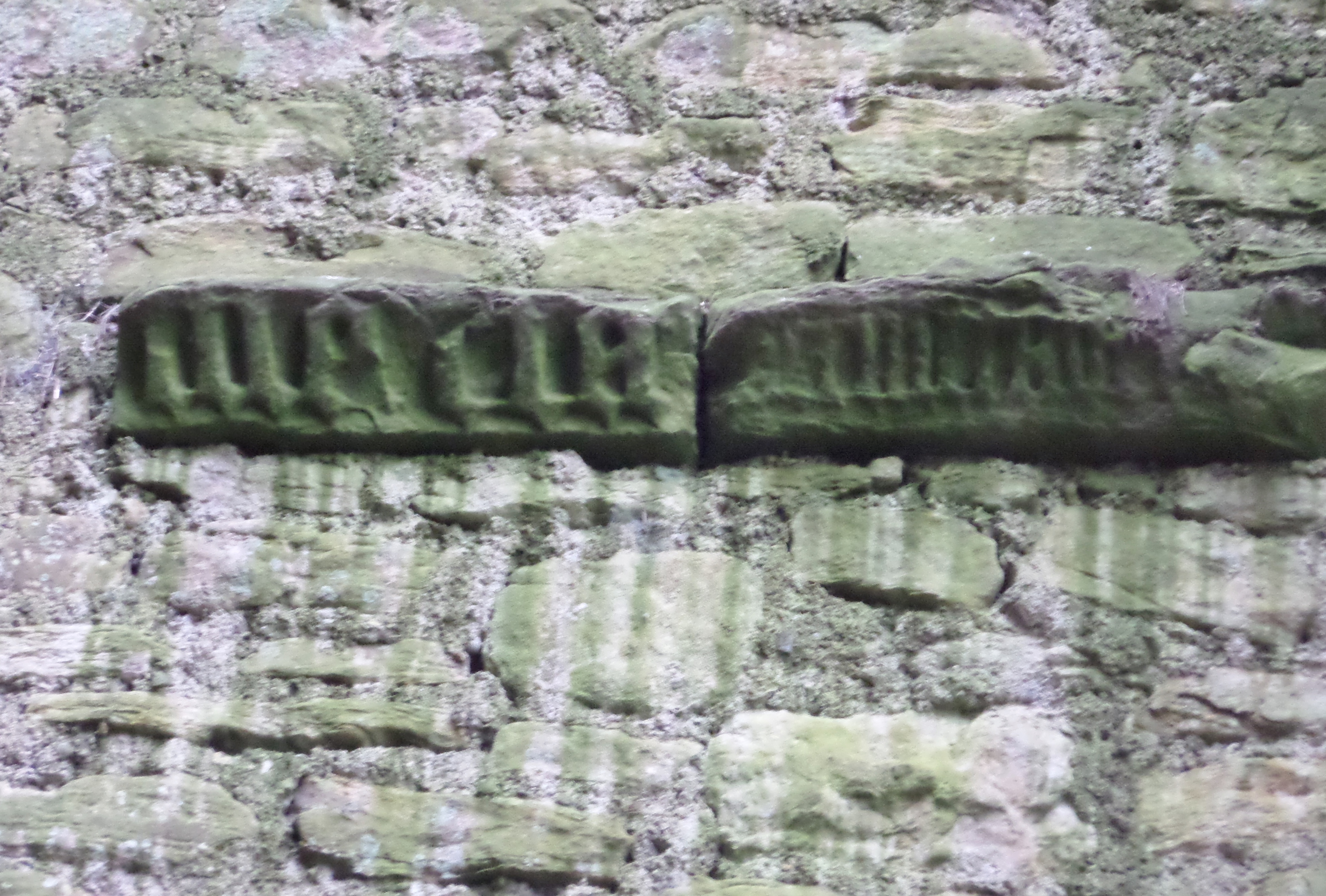
Gothic script set into the 'Grand Hall' fireplace.

Timothy Pont's map, c. 1604, as published by Joan Blaeu in Amsterdam (1654), shows Kilbirnan Castle (sic), as this date precedes the building of the mansion house wing. John Adair's map of c. 1685 shows a castellated structure recorded as Kilburny. Roy's map of 1747 shows the castle and the landscaped avenue feature. A Mains Farm is shown located near to Kilbirnie Kirk. The 1832 Thomson map records 'Killbirny House' and shows a lane running directly from the house to the kirk. The 1856 OS map of refers to 'Kilbirnie House'.

The Honourable Patrick Lindsay purchased the castle and estate of Glengarnock in 1677 from Richard Cuninghame, the last of the Cuninghames of the Barony of Glengarnock. In 1707 both baronies were united in the Barony of Kilburnie, with the Manor House of Kilbirnie as the principal messuage.

=== Keep ===
This very impressive 15th-century structure measures 42 feet by 33 feet, with walls between 7 feet and 8 feet in thickness. A cellar was present and a sleeping loft under a vault. Another vault had a hall, lit by three windows in the south wall and a window high up in the north wall, a private room lay beneath. The tower was four storeys high and in the north-west corner a "starving pit" prison was entered by a hatch from a passage from the stair at loft level. Gun ports are not present.

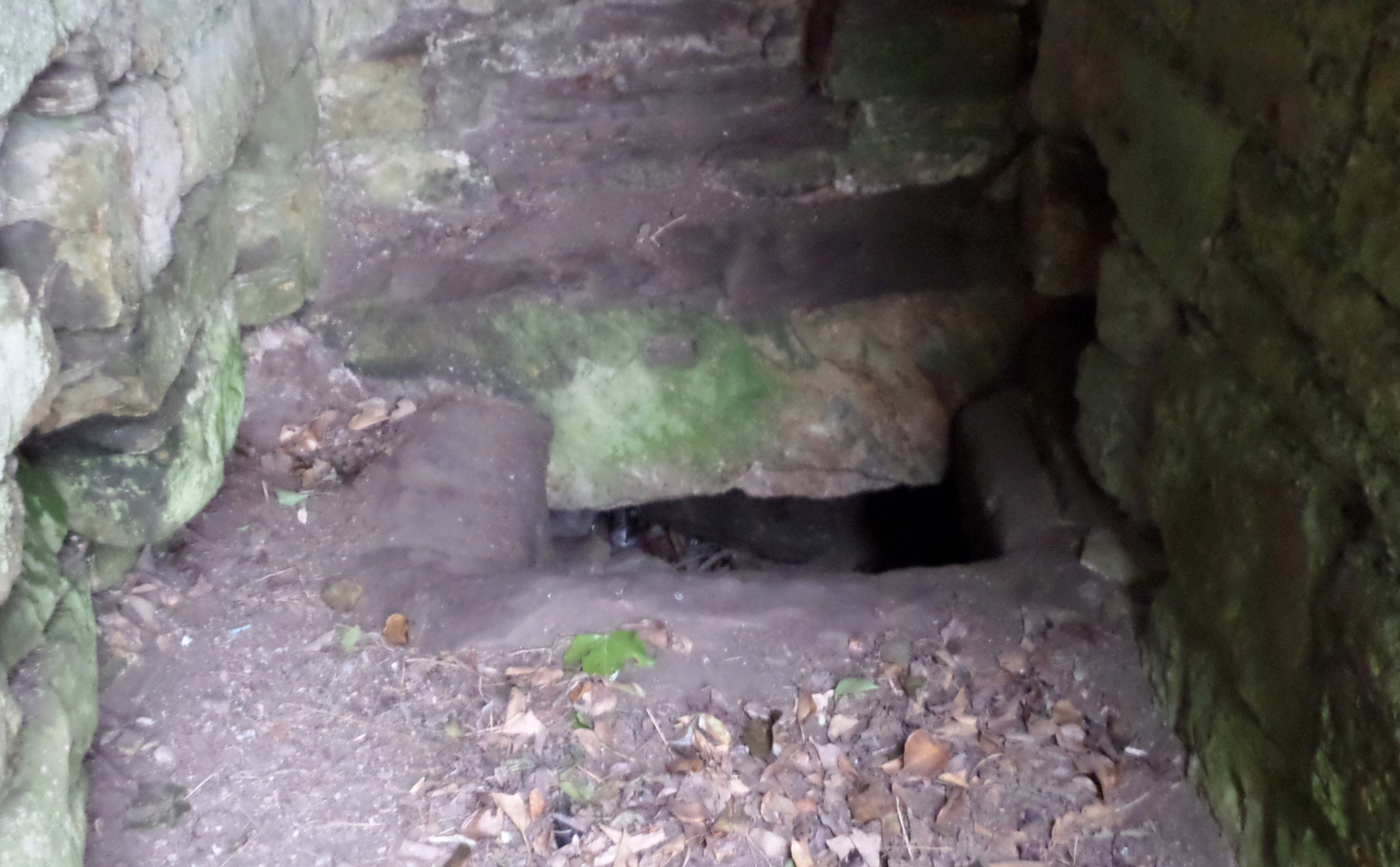
The entrance to the 'Starving Pit' in the castle keep.

In 1602 the Place of Kilbirnie was broken into whilst the laird "was furth of this realme" and his wife Margaret was at Greenock. A John Crawfurd of "Auchinbothe" was arrested and tried, however he was found innocent despite having returned some of the stolen items to Lady Kilbirnie. The charter chest was one of the items broken into and items removed from.

At the north-eastern side of the keep are ruins that represent the site of an oven and other building remnants that probably represent the site of the kitchens.

Divine protection

Set within the main fireplace of the keep are two red sandstone carved pieces with Gothic script. One reads 'Maria' and the other with smaller script has not been deciphered. Sandstone pillars on either side of this fireplace carry carvings of climbing plants that may be ivy. One suggestion regarding the Gothic script carvings in the fireplace is that they could be the names of saints and that this was a religious 'Apotropaic' protective device to prevent the ingress of evil spirits into the house through an otherwise 'unprotected' entry point.

The Puritans acted against images of the Virgin Mary however a widespread use of her name or more usually initials continued. The Gothic script and positioning on the stone suggests that a secondary use from a tomb and this would be seen as doubly potent if it was once housed within the nearby Kilwinning Abbey as it would be seen to have been infused with holy energies.

The old main entrance to the keep was at the east angle of the north side and later entered into a courtyard. The ground level is now considerably raised up and only the arch of the door can be seen.

=== Mansion ===
This wing was constructed in 1627 at right angles to the old keep using rubble faced with dressed with sandstone ashlar. A door was broken through from the hall of the old keep to a staircase in the mansion house. The mansion was a fine specimen of 17th-century architecture. It had turrets corbelled out at hall level and these contained closets. The front door was set in an unusual shallow projection and a narrow back door at the north facing aspect led into a courtyard. Two cellars existed with a passage between them that connected with the main staircase. The hall in the old tower may have been used as a dining area and the large room in the mansion house utilised as a drawing-room. The most southerly turret and a large part of mansion house wing fell at some point between 1956 and 1964.

==== Fire ====
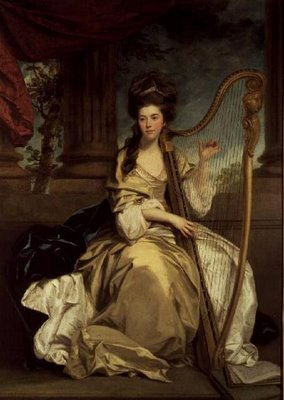
Lady Jean Lindsay as Countess of Eglinton.

The buildings were destroyed by fire early in the morning of 1 May 1757 during construction works, and never rebuilt. A servant who was going to the stables saw that smoke was rising from the roof and gave the alarm. The 21st Earl of Crawfurd, his infant daughter Jean (later a Countess of Eglinton) and domestics had little time to escape the ferocity of the flames. The family moved to the Kilbirnie Barony manse at first and later settled at Bourtreehill House near Irvine. Lady Crawfurd was the eldest daughter and heiress of Robert Hamilton of Bourtreehill.

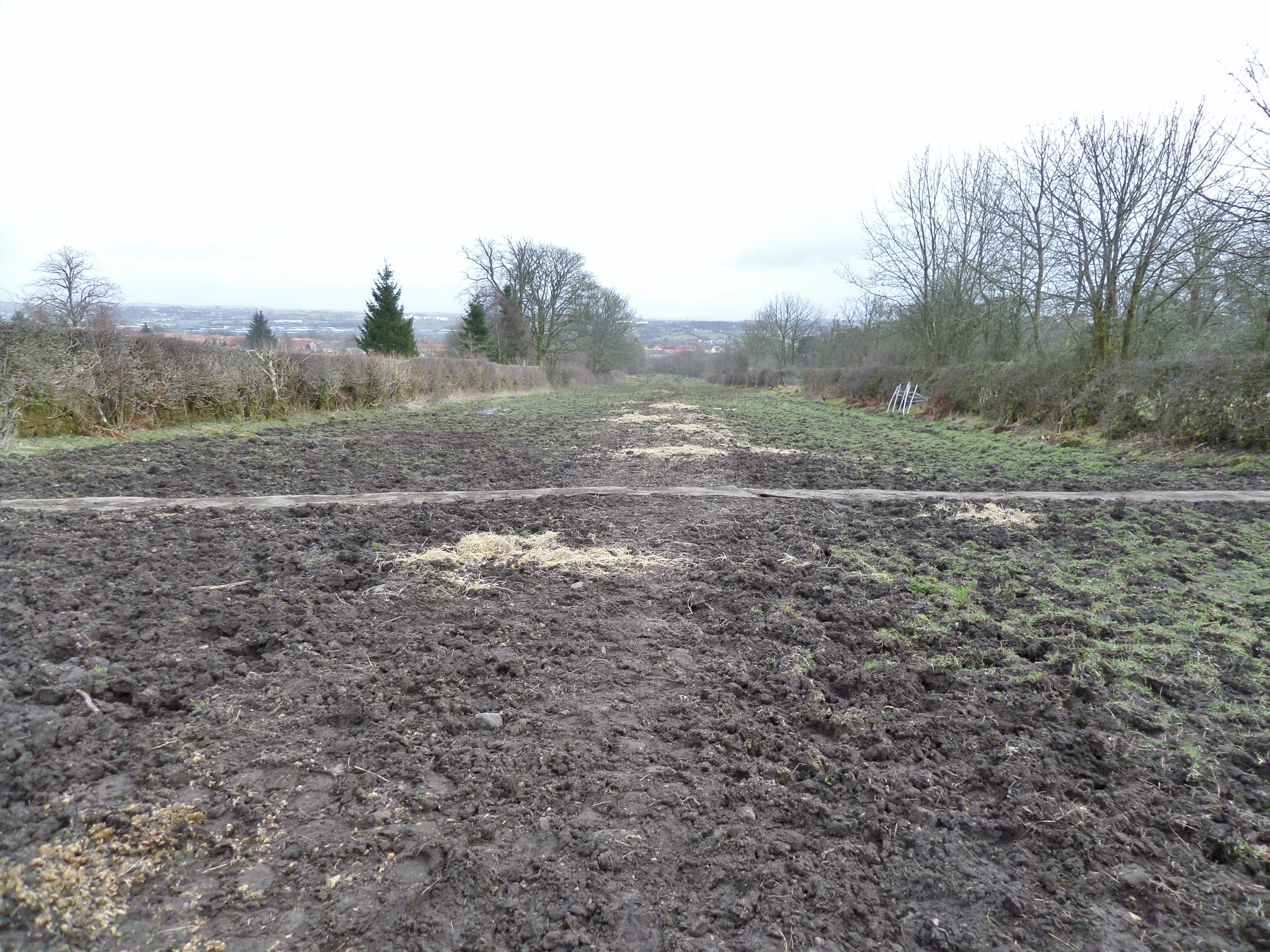
The remains of the 'Grand Avenue'.

Regarding the cause of the fire, the story goes that before going to bed, a lady of the house threw melted grease from the socket of a large candlestick into a fire grate in a lower storey of the house and the ensuing flames set alight the unswept chimney flue, the fire rapidly entering the new mansion wing through windows in the garret that had been left open by workmen. The keys had been taken offsite by carpenters and access to control the fire was impossible. Large numbers of people turned out to help, but their assistance was to no avail. Until the death of the earl in 1781 the cause had been carefully concealed and supernatural forces held to blame.

Some of the buildings were retained for a time as a hunting lodge.

=== Pleasure gardens ===
The approach to the building from the south was a long straight avenue twenty yards wide, bordered by high walls and once enclosing large gardens. The section down to Causewayfoot was bordered by walls and the section down to the termination at Fudstone (now demolished) was tree-lined only. The remnants of the 'Grand Avenue' are still discernable. A substantial walled garden in two portions ran down from the castle to the ravine or glen, long abandoned, and shown on the OS maps with a set of steps between the tow portions and a small building attached to the wall on the northern side. Paterson records that the extensive pleasure-grounds were "torn up by the plough". The gardens once contained flowers and shrubs, potatoes, turnips, and orchards. As late as 1856 the walled garden is shown as containing what may have been apple trees of which one survives (2015).

=== Estate ===
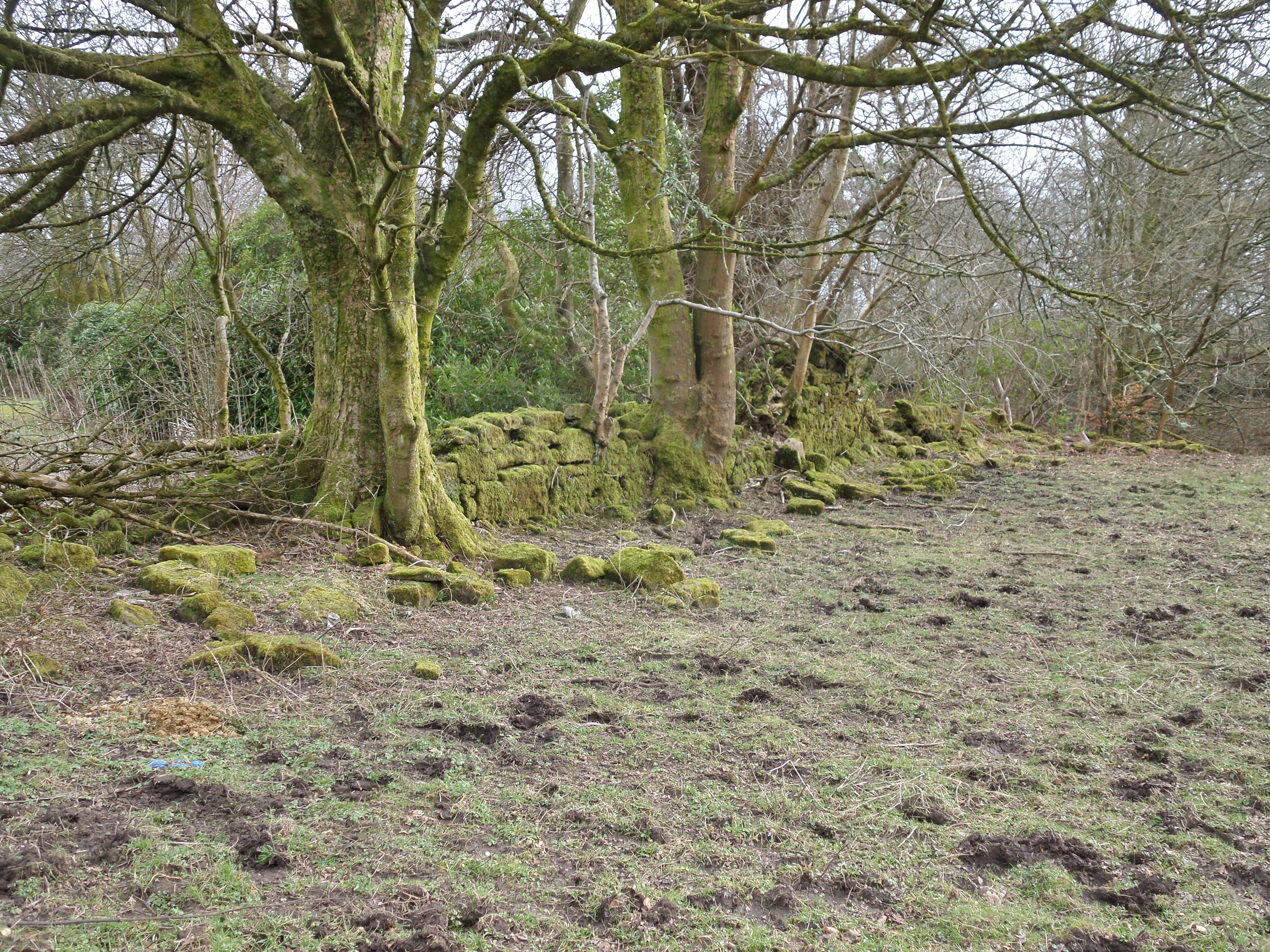
Ruins of the walled garden.

The mains farm is recorded as Place Farm and sometimes, confusingly, as Kilbirnie Place. The old castle site is recorded as Kilbirnie House. A lane ran up to the Largs Road from Causewayfoot, via a dwelling at Parkfoot, now demolished, crossing the Paduff Burn rivulet by a ford.

Birinie's well was a spring that supplied excellent water. It was about a quarter of a mile north of the Kilbirnie Castle ruins and water was carried to the castle by pipes. The well was named after St Brendan (Sanctus Birinius), a 6th century saint associated with Kilbirnie Church. The well has been 'capped' and its site sits at the end of an old path.

Ordnance Survey (OS) maps show that a sandstone quarry was located at Causewayfoot, overlooked by the old but now demolished dwelling at Selsy, with cottages and the farm of Causewayfoot standing nearby. A small ironstone pit was also present. The OS 6 in. of 1897, 1911, 1938 show a trapezoidal curling pond south-west of Kilbirnie Castle and records show that a match was played between Kilbirnie v. Dalry 3 rinks each, on 20 February 1895. The curling pond built below the Causewayfoot is now drained and overgrown, shown as already abandoned in 1938. A lozenge-shaped curling pond at Fudstone south-west of the dwelling is shown on OS 6 in. 1st ed. ca. 1860, 1897 and 1911. The Nether Mill is recorded as the Barony Mill of Kilbirnie under the name Nethermiln of Kilbirnie.

=== Auld Kirk of Kilbirnie ===
The arms of the Barclays, impaled with those of Crawfurd are carved on a panel located on the tower of the kirk. The Crawfurds added the Crawfurd Aisle to the Auld Kirk with its fine Renaissance-style carvings of 1642. A private apartment is located behind with the family burial vaults lying beneath. The numerous heraldic shields were carved for John, first Viscount Garnock, and represent the armorial bearings of his ancestors.

== Associated families ==
=== Barclays ===
The castle passed from the Barclays to the Crawfurds through the marriage of Marjory, an heiress, to Malcolm Crawfurd. Marjory was the daughter of Sir John Barclay of Kilbirnie and Craufurd-John. These Barclays of Kilbirnie are thought to have been a branch of the ancient family of the Barclays of Ardrossan. Sir Walter Barclay was Lord High Chamberlain of Scotland in 1174 and married Margaret Crawfurd of Craufurd-John. Marjory was descended from this line.

=== Crawfurds ===
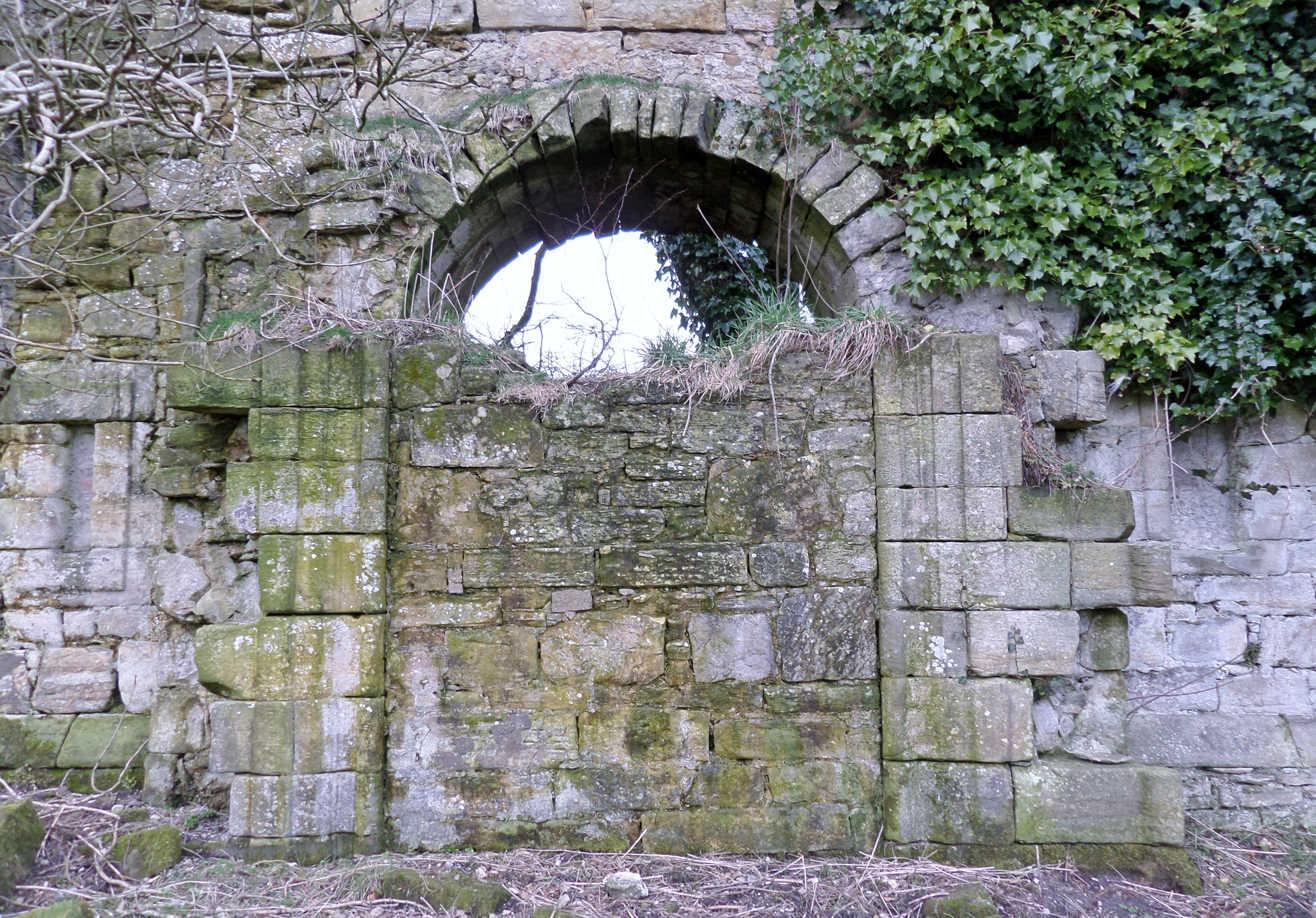
The main entrance to the 16th-century wing.

In 1470 Thomas Crawfurd, sometimes written as Crauford or Crawford, obtained the castle through marriage. He was descended from the Crawfurds of Loudoun Castle. John Crawfurd married Margaret Blair, daughter of John Blair of that Ilk, and their son, John Crawfurd, married Lady Mary Cunningham, the daughter of James, 7th Earl of Glencairn. Their son, Sir John Crawfurd, was knighted by Charles I in 1642 and fought in the Civil Wars, but died without any heirs in 1661. Before his death, he married Magdalen Carnegie, daughter of David Carnegie, styled Lord Carnegie (as son and heir apparent of the 1st Earl of Southesk) and Lady Margaret Hamilton (a daughter of the 1st Earl of Haddington). Cornelius Crawfurd of Jordanhill was the closest relative, however Sir John's youngest daughter, Maragaret Crawfurd, inherited the estate of Kilbirnie. She married Hon. Patrick Lindsay (second son of the 17th Earl of Crawford).

In 1810 John Crawfurd assumed the name Lindsay and claimed to be descended from the Hon. James Crawfurd, third son of the first Viscount Garnock. After much expense and deliberation the story was found to be entirely false and the claim rejected. To add some credibility to the claim he had claimed that his forebear had been the eldest son and heir and had been forced to flee to Ireland after having murdered a man in a duel by firing before the signal. This duel he claimed had been over a matter of honour relating to the Lady Susanna Kennedy, later Countess of Eglinton, with whom he was entirely smitten.

The Crawfurd-Pollocks of Pollok and Kilbirnie were granted a baronetcy that was extinct by 1885.

=== Lindsay Crawfurds ===
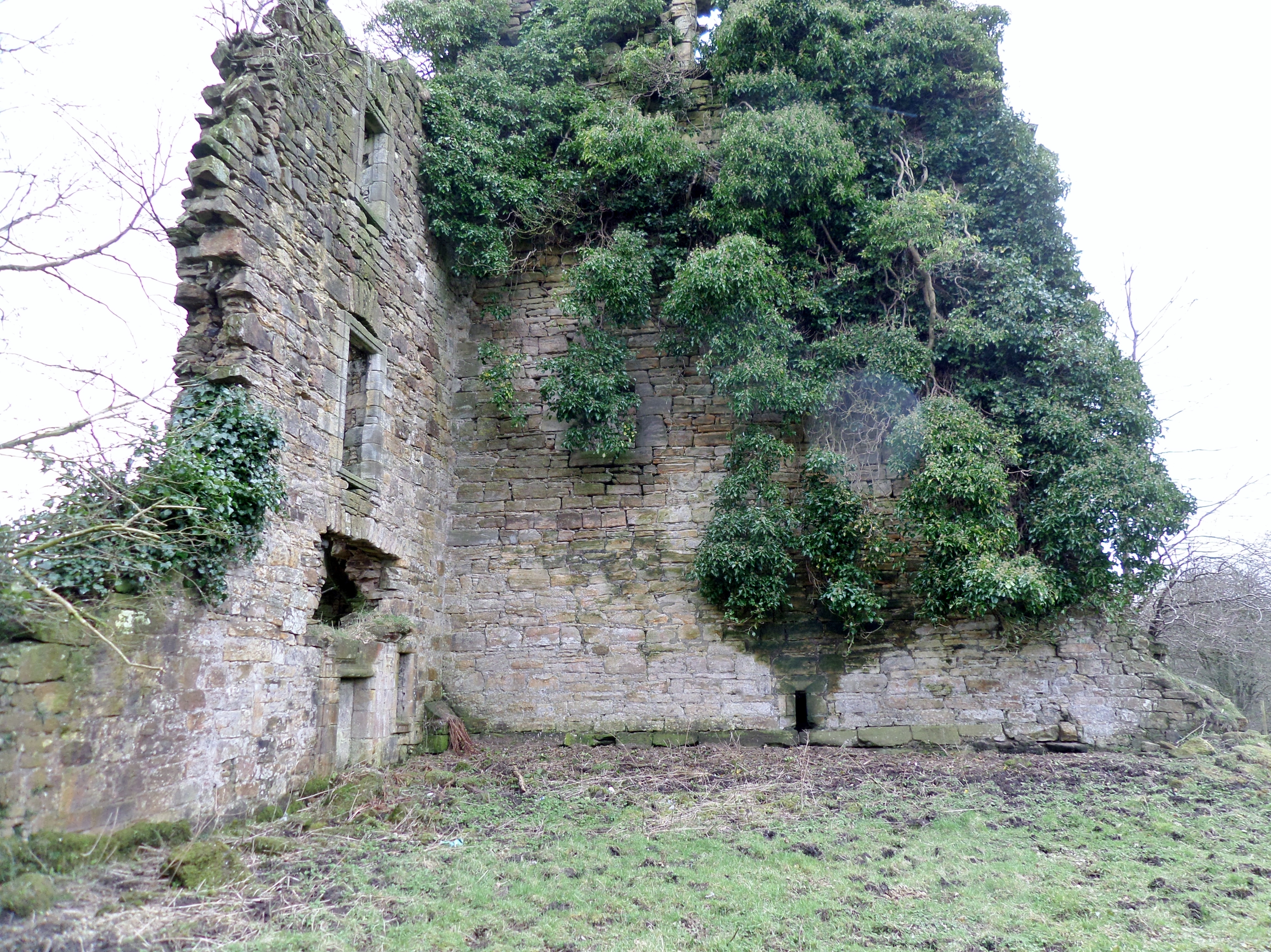
The courtyard area and site of the old kitchen block.

Margaret Crawfurd had been married to Patrick, second son of John, 15th Earl of Crawfurd and 1st of Lindsay. Her husband took the title and armorial bearings of Crawfurd of Kilburnie as per the entail to the estate. The couple died only three days apart in 1680 from a malignant fever that also carried off her sister, Lady Blackhall, when she came down for the funeral. Records show that a significant number of mourners travelled down from Glasgow to the funeral. The eldest son of their seven children, John, inherited in 1690. John Crawfurd became the commander of the Fencible men of Cuninghame in 1689 and in 1693 he was chosen as the Ayrshire member of the Scots Parliament. In 1705 he was created Viscount Mount Crawfurd (later changed to Viscount Garnock) by Queen Anne, and died in December 1708. He married Margaret Stewart, daughter of the first Earl of Bute, and the couple had two sons and three daughters. The line continued until George Lindsay Crawfurd inherited, the 20th Earl of Crawfurd, 6th Earl of Lindsay, and 4th Viscount Garnock, who died unmarried in 1808 and the estates passed to his sister, Lady Mary Lindsay Crawfurd who also died unmarried in 1833.

=== Boyles ===
In 1833 George Boyle, 4th Earl of Glasgow, inherited the ruins of the fire-gutted castle and house from Lady Mary Lindsay Crawfurd. George was descended from Margaret, eldest daughter of Maragret Crawfurd and Patrick Lindsay, who had married David Boyle, 1st Earl of Glasgow.

=== Knoxs ===
At the break up of the Earl of Glasgow's estates the castle and lands were purchased by Sir James Knox.

=== Coughlin ===
In early 2025 Paul and Denise Coughlin of San Diego, California purchased the Place Farm which includes the ruins of Kilbrinie Castle and the 22 acre grounds surrounding property. Kilbirnie is the birthplace of Paul Coughlin and bought the grounds with the intention of restoring and maintaining the integrity of the Castle for the public to enjoy.

== Place House ==
Kilbirnie Place, or Place House, was built between 1892 and 1894 for Sir James Knox. The house was designed by Henry Lord of Manchester. The building was demolished and only the outbuildings now survive.

== See also ==
- Barony of Ladyland
- Giffordland
- Glengarnock Castle
- Nether Mill
