= Glengarnock Castle =

- Kilbirnie, North Ayrshire, Scotland; UK grid reference NS310573
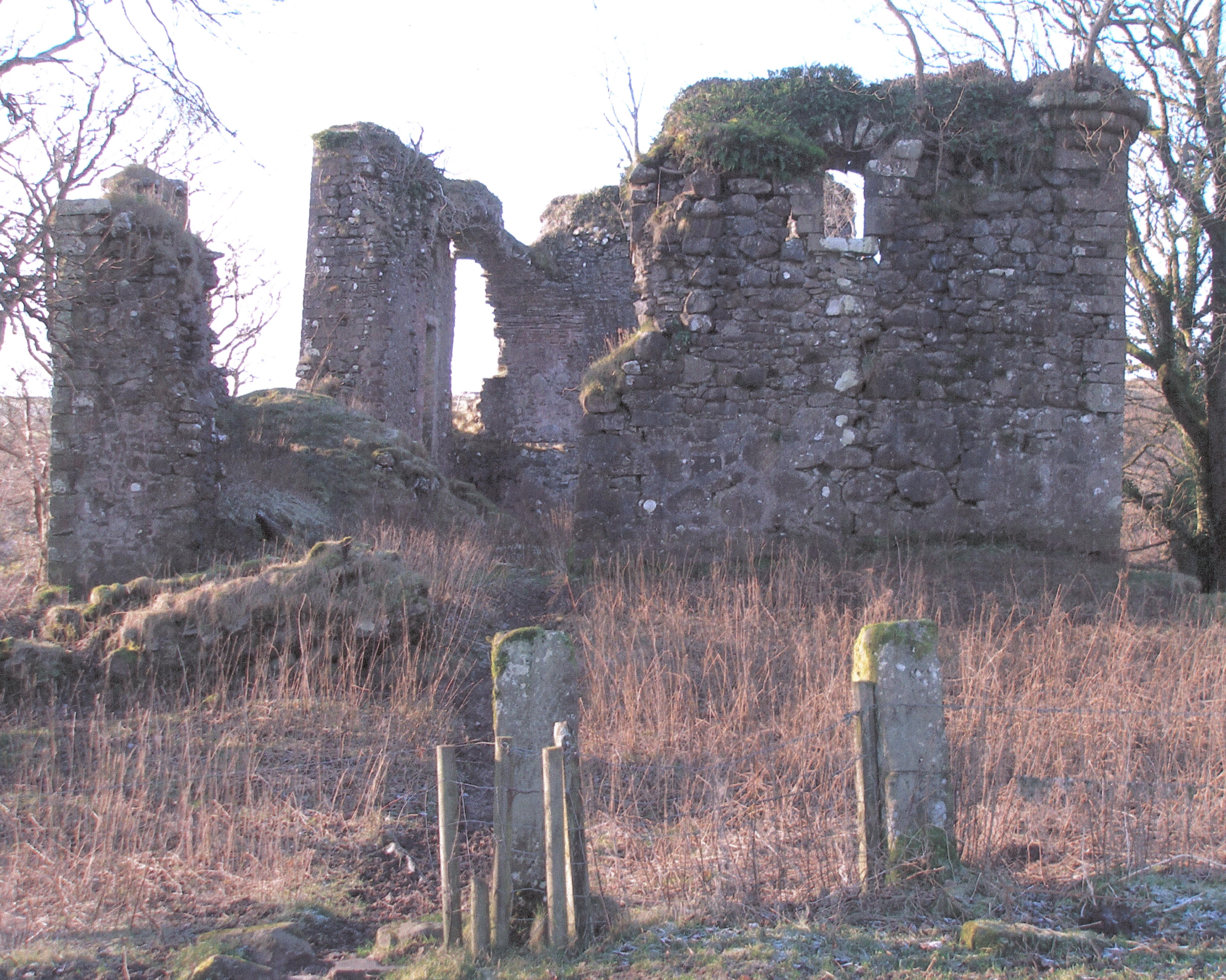
- The entrance to Glengarnock Castle

Site information
- Type: Tower
- Controlled by: Cunninghame clan
- Open to the public: yes
- Condition: Ruined

Location
- Shown within Scotland
- Coordinates: 55.77998°N 4.69567°W
- Grid reference: grid reference NS310573

Site history
- Built: 15th century
- Built by: Cunninghames
- In use: Until early 18th century
- Materials: Stone

Glengarnock Castle is one of the ancient ruined fortifications of Ayrshire. Its keep is located on a remote rocky promontory overlooking the River Garnock about 2 miles (3.2 km) north of the town of Kilbirnie in North Ayrshire, Scotland. There is no clear account of when this was erected or by whom, but it may have been built by the Cunningham (or Cunninghame) family or by the Riddels who preceded them. The Barony of Glengarnock is one of three feudal baronies which together form the parish of Kilbirnie in the district of Cunningham which lies in north Ayrshire. The River Garnock flows through the village of the same name 4 kilometres (2.5 mi) to the south, but the name Glen Garnock applies more specifically to the ravine at Glengarnock Castle.

The ruins were stabilized in 1841 by William Cochran Patrick of Ladyland, following a partial collapse in a storm of 1839. Dobie records that .."foundations, where undermined, have been secured; wasted portions of the walls taken down and substantially restored, the whole of which have been carefully pointed with mortar; while the interior has been cleared of the rubbish and soil accumulated during more than a hundred years of abandonment and degradation"; the structure still continues to deteriorate although without these repairs little would have survived.

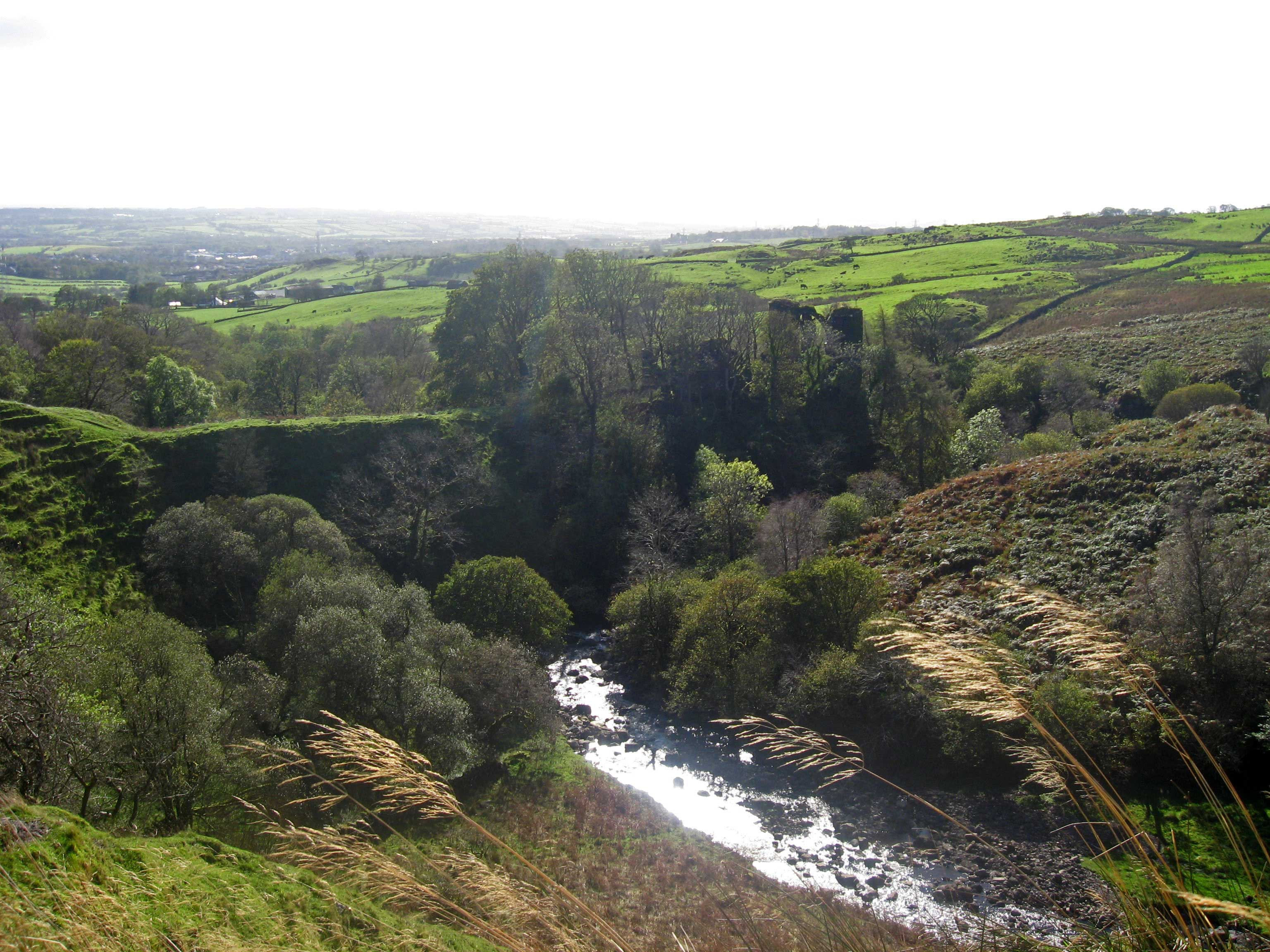
The castle stands on a narrow outcrop high above the ravine of the River Garnock

== History ==
In the 12th and 13th centuries, the lands here were held for the King by the De Morville family, hereditary Great Constables of Scotland. A castle may have been built here by them; a convenient site in relation to the abbey they founded at Kilwinning. The Barony of Glengarnock then passed to the Riddels and the Cunninghames. Mary, Queen of Scots, visited in 1563. Sir James Cunningham built the Glengarnock Aisle in Kilbirnie Auld Kirk in 1597. The Cunninghames retained the castle until the early 17th century, and by the 18th century it had been abandoned. The Honourable Patrick Lindsay of Kilbirnie Place purchased the castle and estate of Glengarnock in 1677 from Richard Cuninghame, the last of the Cuninghames of Garnock. In 1707 both baronies were united in the Barony of Kilbirnie, with Kilbirnie Place as the principal dwelling.

William Dobie records that Sir James Cunningham in 1609 assigned the 'Lands of Glengarnock' to his creditors and went to Ireland where he managed the 12,000 acres of land that King James VI had granted him. The estate was sold by the creditors to Cunningham of Robertland, however, the son was unable to retain the lands and Adam Watt, Clerk to the Signet obtained them before selling them in 1630 to the husband of the heiress of Kilbirne, the Honourable Patrick Lindsay.

== Description ==
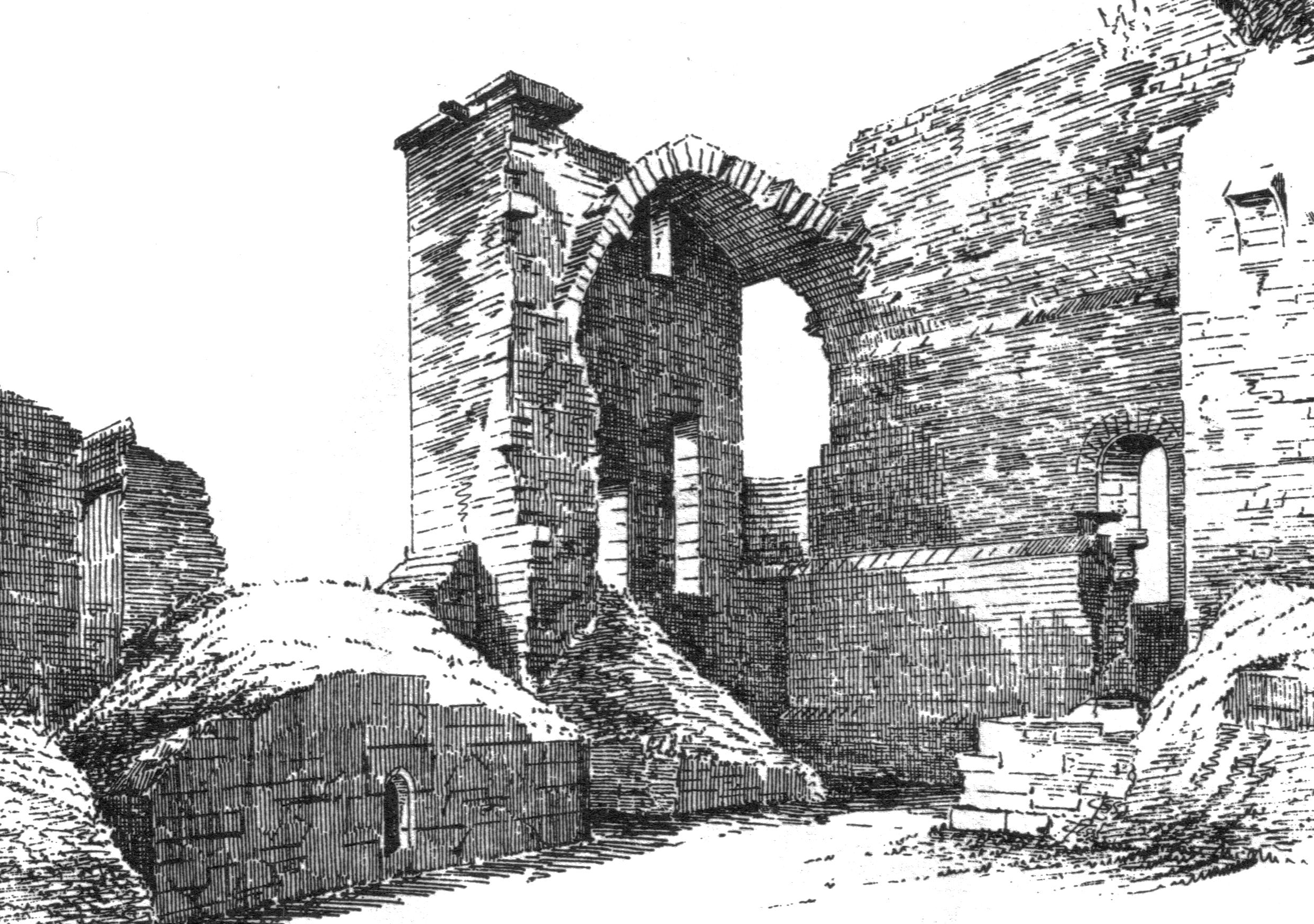
Glengarnock Castle circa 1887 - 92.

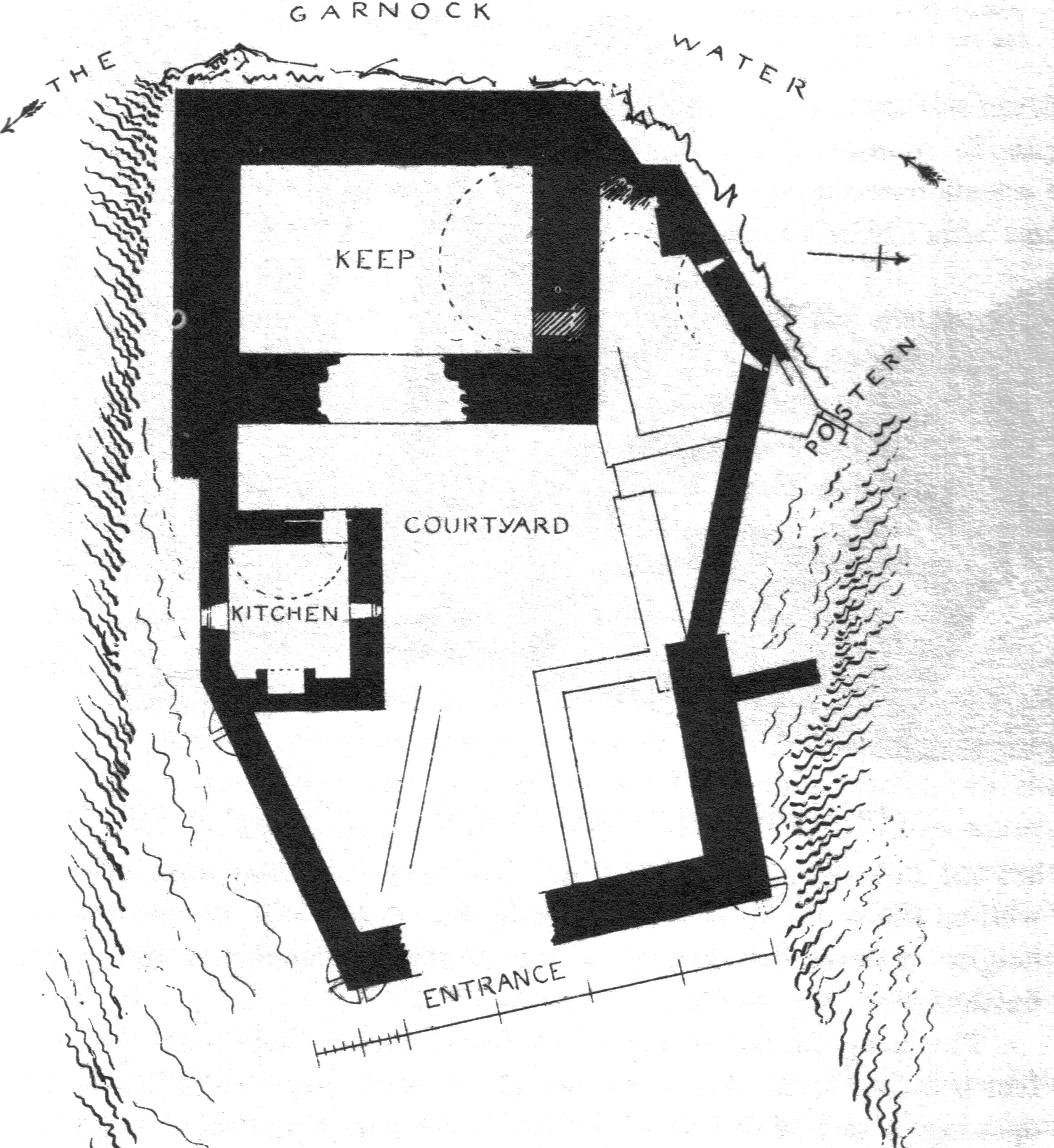
A plan of Glengarnock Castle.

The castle is an example of a keep with courtyard attached and dates from the period 1400 - 1542, with various later buildings in the courtyard. It is described in the New Statistical Account of Scotland (1845) as follows:

"The ruins of Glengarnock Castle stand on a precipitous ridge or knoll, overhanging the Garnock, about two miles (3 km) north of Kilbirnie. This brawling stream skirts two sides of the knoll; and as the ravine through which it flows is fully eighty feet in depth, the position, under the ancient system of warfare, must have combined security with the means of easy defence. The only access to the castle is from the northeast, in which direction the ridge, upon which it is situated, is connected with the adjoining field. At the distance of thirty yards from its entrance, a depression in the ground indicates what has been the course of a dry moat, by which, and a drawbridge, the approach is said to have been protected."

In 1956, this dry moat was still 30 metres in length and had an average depth of 4 metres with a width of 8 metres. Evidence in 1964 was recorded of a small building lying in between the dry moat and the castle, possibly a farmstead. The New Statistical Account continues:

"The ground-plan of this ancient stronghold could, until lately, be easily traced; and as a portion of the exterior walls still remains nearly the original height, its appearance when entire may, with little difficulty, be yet shadowed out. From notes and measurements taken a few years ago, it may be described in general terms, as having consisted of a quadrilateral tower, with a court of less elevated buildings extending from its east side. The entrance has been from the eastern extremity of the latter. This facade is 46 feet (14 m) long, and has been about 24 feet (7.3 m) in height. A court or passage, 59 feet (18 m) in length, lay between the entrance and the tower, on each side of which has been a range of two-storied apartments. The tower is 45 feet (14 m) long, 33 feet (10 m) wide, and its height has been above 40 feet (12 m)."

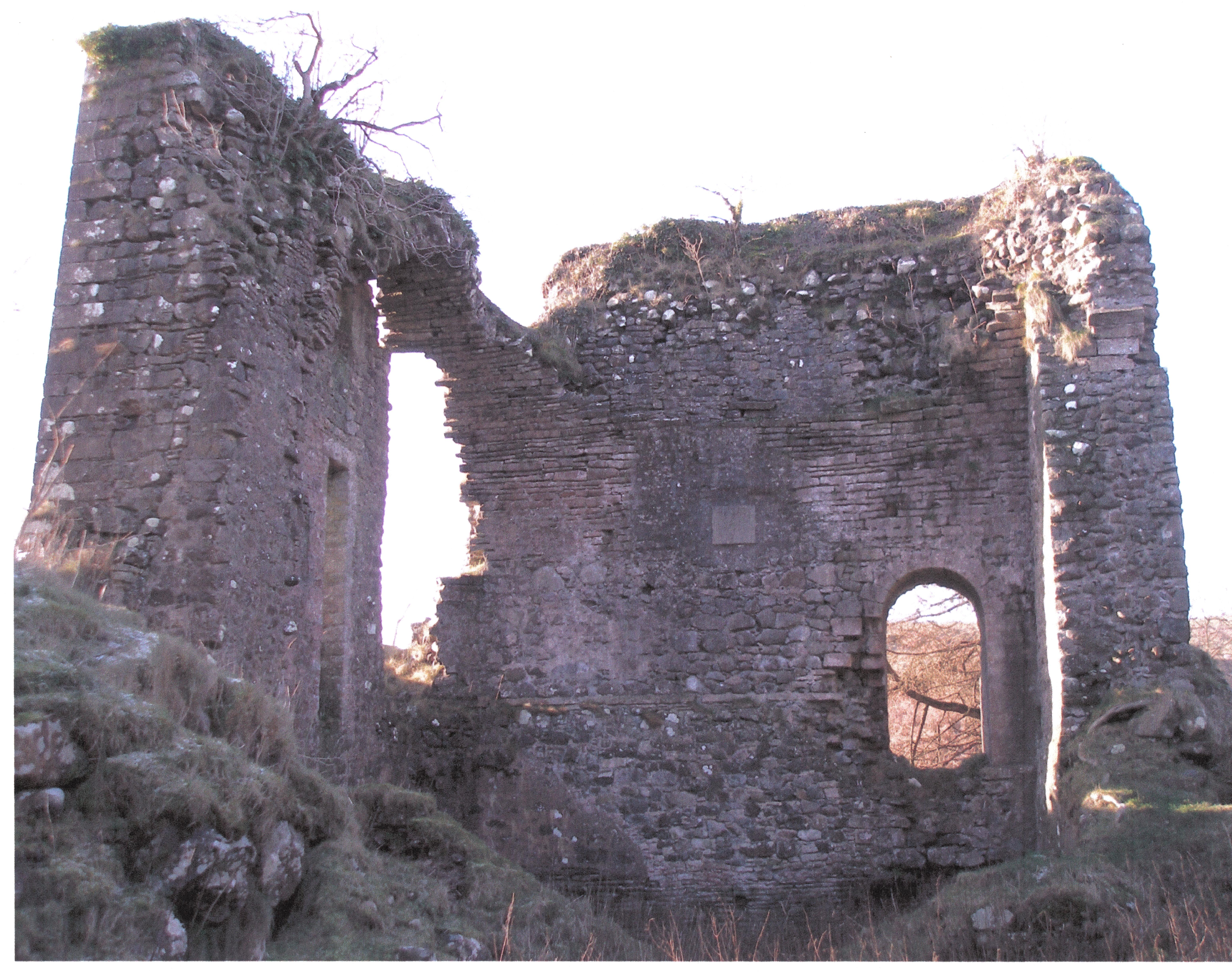
The far wall of the old keep showing the plaque commemorating the consolidation of the ruins in 1841.

"Its upper and now only accessible story has consisted of a hall occupying the whole extent within the walls, and the imbowed ceiling of which has been 20 feet (6.1 m) in height. It has been lighted both from the court and from the exterior walls. One of the windows overlooks the rugged chasm through which murmurs the Garnock, and from two narrow apertures facing the east, the eye may yet revel over a beautiful extent of the district bearing the same name as the old lords of the castle. From the hall, a narrow circular stair led to the upper part of the building, which has been surrounded by a parapet wall. The ruins show neither the arrow-slit nor gun-port of defence, so common in similar old houses. Perhaps the situation was of itself so secure as to render unnecessary the ordinary means of repelling an attack. The uniformity of style in all castellated mansions, erected prior to the discovery of gunpowder, renders it hazardous to be precise regarding the date of their construction. Few, however, conversant with such remnants of feudal architecture, would hesitate to assign to the ruins of this stronghold, an antiquity as remote as that of any remains of masonry in the west of Scotland."

John Smith records in the 1890s that a substantial midden had built up below the castle over the years and this was largely formed from ashes from the typical local low quality coal, together with broken fragments of tiles and patterned glass with chipped and roughened edges.

Just below the castle on the River Garnock is Garrat's Linn, (linn being Scots for a pool in a river).
