= Baron of Glengarnock =

Nobility title in the Baronage of Scotland

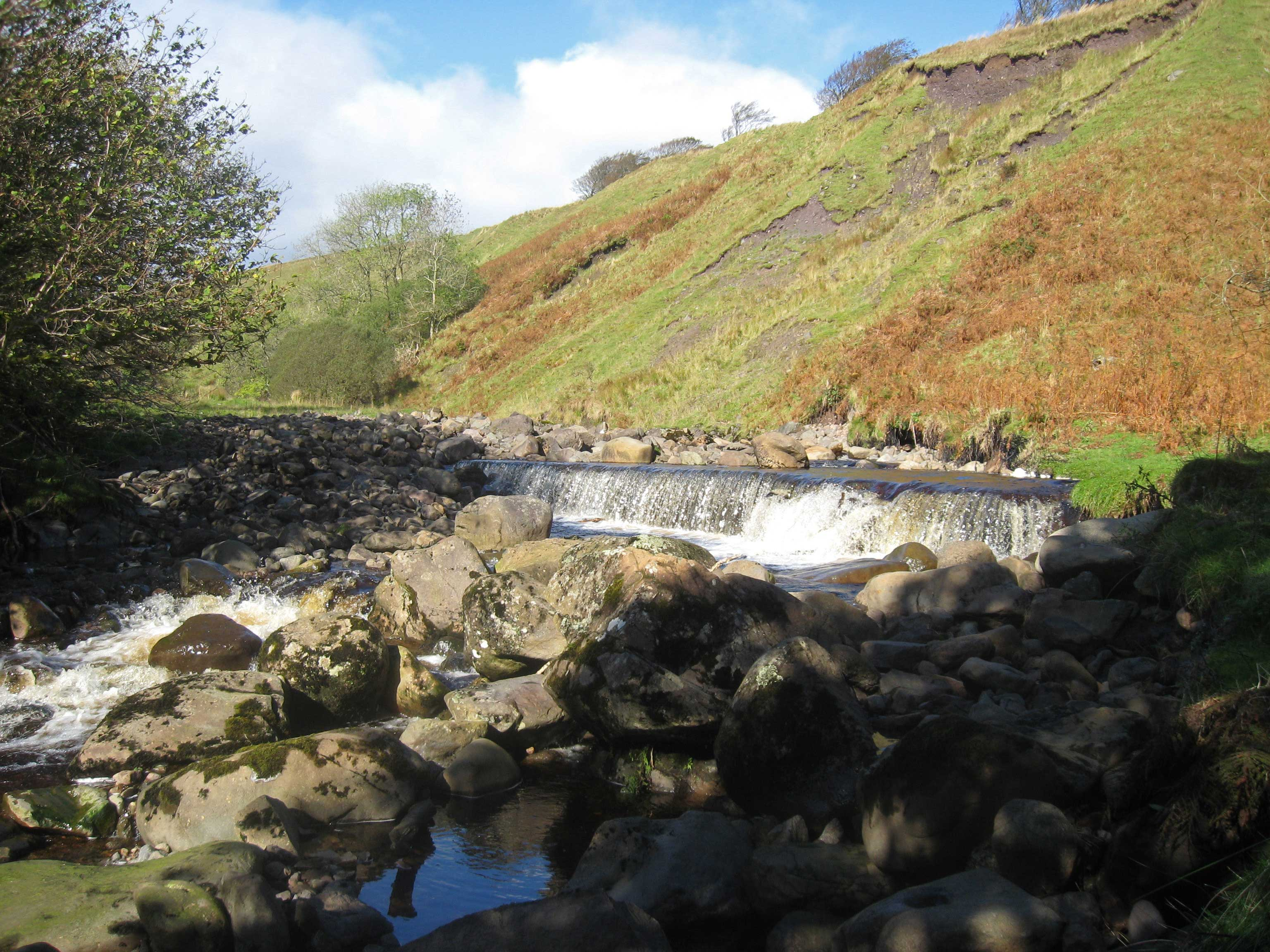
River Garnock Upstream from Castle

Baron of Glengarnock is a title of nobility in the Baronage of Scotland in the county of Ayrshire.

The Crown Charter proscribes the Barony of Glengarnock baronial lands as follows: “The lands and barony of Glengarnock, the dominical lands of Glengarnock, the lands of Blackburn, Blackhill, Birkhill and Barhill, and marshes and waters called Paddockholm, the lands of Bridgeend, Henyholm, Pewlands and Burnside, Bashaw, Baillieston and Damathland, Kirklands of Kilbirnie, the Mill of Glengarnock and Multures of the same, the loch called Loch Tankard, the lands of Burns, Auchinhove, Denholm, Loch Rigg and Lochend, the six shilling and eight penny lands of Corse and forty shilling lands of Cherrylands, all lying in the Parishes of Kilburnie and County of Ayr”

The current baron is The Much Hon. Robert S. MacGregor, Baron of Glengarnock.

== Historical Barons ==
=== de Morvilles and Riddells ===
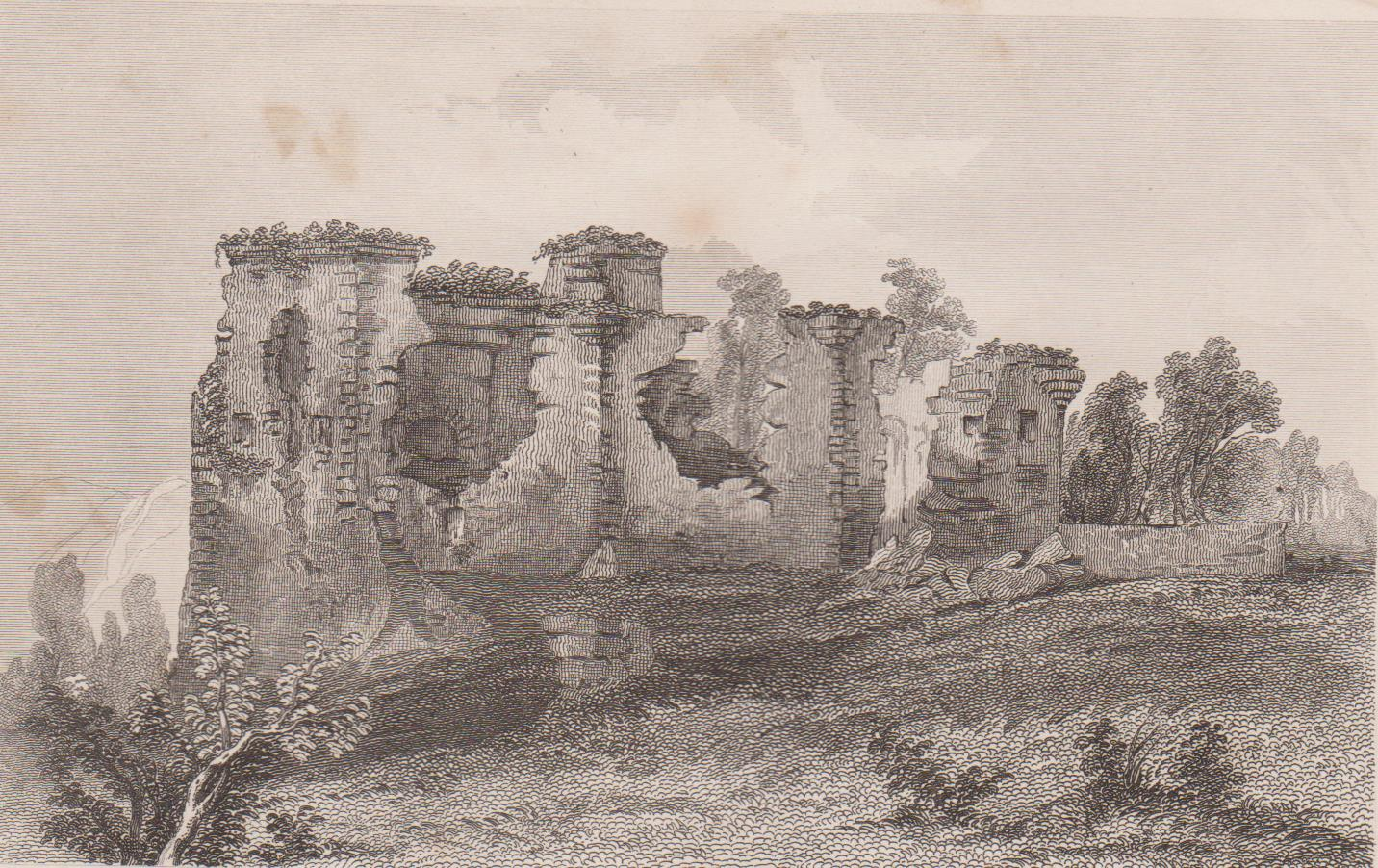
Glengarnock Castle.

In the 12th and 13th centuries, the lands here were held for the King by the De Morville family, hereditary Great Constables of Scotland. The barony was anciently in the possession of a family of the name of Riddell, supposed to have been descended from the Riddells of Teviotdale.

=== Cunninghams ===
Cunningham family Coat of Arms

Reginald Cunningham. The earliest proprietor of the Glengarnock barony is believed to be Reginald Cunningham, of a cadet branch of the Cunninghams of Glencairn. Reginald was the second son of Edward Cunningham of Kilmaurs and Mary, daughter of the High Steward of Scotland. Reginald married Jonet Riddell, the daughter and heiress of Riddell of Glengarnock sometime around the middle of the thirteenth century.

William Cunningham of Glengarnock. In 1547, William Cunningham of Glengarnock is recorded as having been killed at the Battle of Pinkie.

Sir James Cunningham. William Dobie records that Sir James Cunningham in 1609 assigned the 'Lands of Glengarnock' to his creditors and went to Ireland where he managed the 12,000 acres of land that King James VI had granted him. The estate was sold by the creditors to William Cunningham of Quarrelston.

William Cunningham of Quarrelston. In 1654, William Cunningham of Quarrelston alienated the property to Richard Cunningham, eldest son of William Cunningham, a Writer to the Signet, member of a cadet branch of the Cunningham of Ashinyards family.

Richard Cunningham. Richard Cunningham was a staunch supporter of the House of Stuart and as such rallied to the Royal Standard during the Wars of the Three Kingdoms, 1638–1651. In 1648, Richard took part in the Royalist invasion of England only to be defeated at the Battle of Preston (1648), and again in 1651 he rode south to be beaten by the Cromwellian army at the Battle of Worcester. Richard avoided capture and returned home to Glengarnock where he died and was buried in the Glengarnock Aisle of Kilbirnie Kirk.

Richard Cunningham. Upon the death of Richard the elder, his eldest son Richard Cunningham succeeded him.

=== Lindsays ===
Patrick Lindsay. The Honourable Patrick Lindsay of Kilbirnie Place purchased the castle and estate of Glengarnock in 1677 from Richard Cuninghame, the last of the Cuninghames of Garnock. Patrick Lindsay was second son of John Lindsay, 17th Earl of Crawford and 1st Earl of Lindsay. The Lindsays had already gained the adjacent barony of Kilbirnie through the marriage of Patrick Lindsay and Margaret, second daughter of Sir John Crawford of Kilbirnie.

John Lindsay Crawford. In 1681, Patrick was succeeded by his son John Lindsay Crawford. In 1703, John was created Viscount Garnock, Lord Kilbirnie, Kingsburn, and Drumry by Queen Anne. In 1701, he adorned the laird's loft of the fifteenth century parish church of Kilbirnie with eighteen shields of the Lindsay lineage.

Patrick Lindsay Crawford. In 1708 John Lindsay Crawford's son Patrick became the 2nd Viscount Garnock. He died in 1735 and was buried among his ancestors in Kilbirnie Auld Kirk.

John Lindsay Crawford. Patrick's eldest son John became the 3rd Viscount upon Patrick's death, but John died aged 16 only to be succeeded by his brother George as the 4th Viscount.

George Lindsay Crawford. In 1749, George fell heir to the titles and estates of John, 20th Earl of Crawford and 4th Lord Lindsay and settled with his wife Jean Hamilton at Kilbirnie Castle. Kilbirnie Castle was largely destroyed by fire in 1757, forcing George him to move to his property at Crawford Priory in Fife. George died in 1781.

George Lindsay Crawford. Upon the death of his father in 1781, his eldest son George, a major-general in the British Army inherited the lands and titles. George died in 1808 and as having no children or surviving brothers.

Lady Mary Lindsay Crawford. Upon the death of George in 1808, the Crawford-Lindsay estates, along with the feudal titles which were then tied to the land, including the Barony of Glengarnock, went to Lady Mary Lindsay Crawford, and subsequently to the Earls of Glasgow.

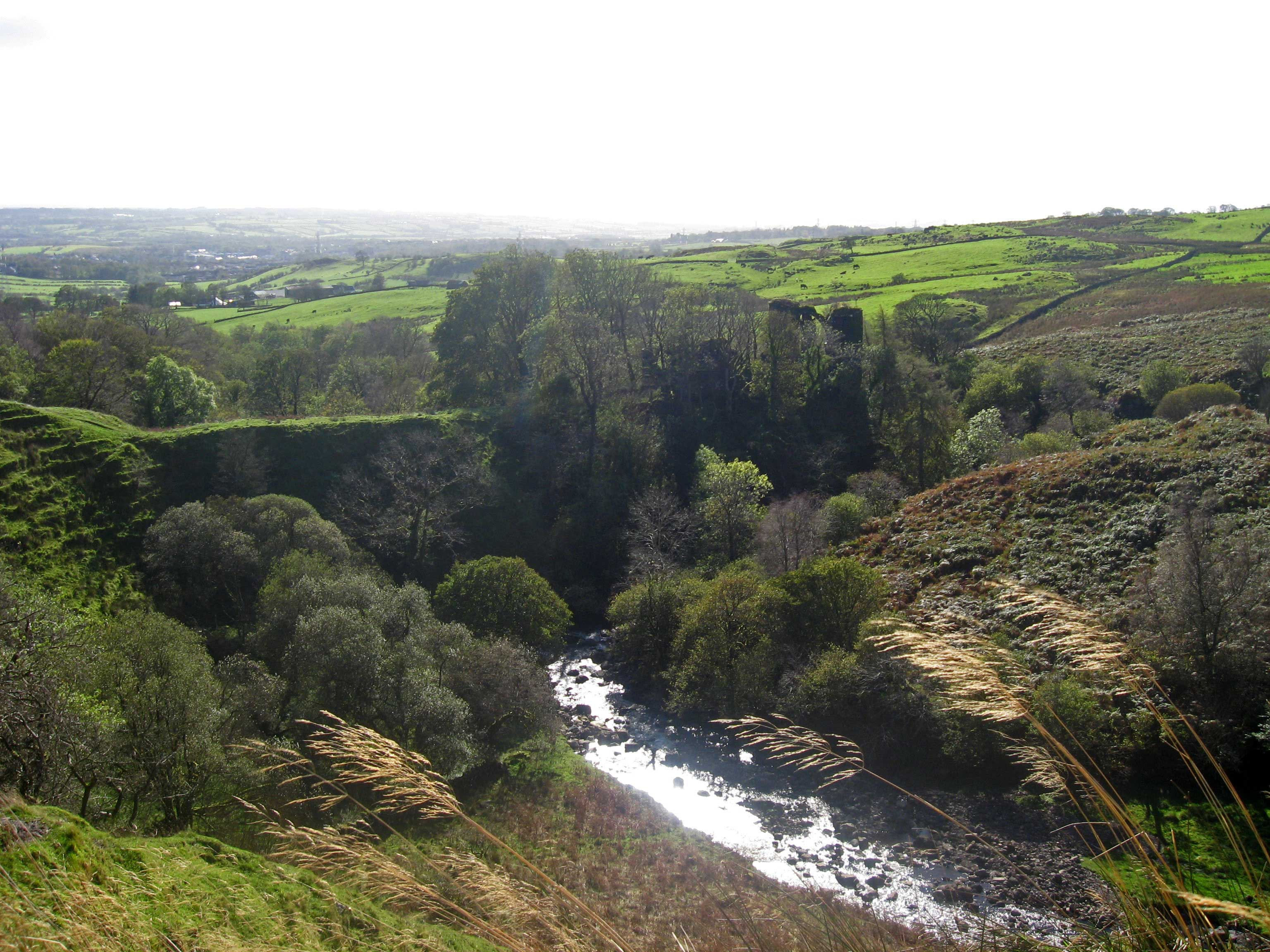
Garnock Glen and Castle.

=== Earls of Glasgow ===
In 1801, the Barony of Glengarnock title was affirmed and assigned of to George, Earl of Glasgow and Crawfurd Lindsay. A Signature of Resignation under the Great Seal of Scotland dated 3 February 1801, written to the seal and registered and sealed at Edinburgh on 12 May 1801 affirms the barony and confirms the assignation, containing the words “totas et integras terras baroniam de Glengarnock” (“All and whole the lands and barony of Glengarnock”).

The Barony of Glengarnock thereafter remained in the line of the Earls of Glasgow until eventual disposition to the MacGregors of Rannoch. This is demonstrated by a series of registrations: in 1834, an Instrument of Sasine in favour of the Earl of Glasgow; in 1845 an Instrument of Sasine in favour of James Lindsay Crawford, Earl of Glasgow; In 1869 a Decree of Special Service in favour of George Frederick Lindsay Crawford, Earl of Glasgow (formerly the Honourable George Frederick Boyle), establishing the Earl of Glasgow as the heir to his predecessor James Lindsay Crawford, Earl of Glasgow who died on 11 March 1869; in 1870, a Writ of Confirmation by the Great Steward of Scotland (i.e. the Prince of Wales) in favour of the Right Honourable George Frederick Lindsay Crawfurd, Earl of Glasgow.

=== MacGregors ===
After 1889, the Barony was vested Thomas Horatio Arthur Ernest Cochrane, Baron Cochrane of Cults from the Right Honourable Ralph Henry Vere Cochrane, Fourth Baron Cochrane of Cults, and finally to the line of the MacGregors, ancestral lairds of Learagan in Rannoch.

== See also ==
- Baron
- Baronage of Scotland
