= Patrick Crawfurd =

Scottish aristocrat (1646-1681)

The Honourable Patrick Crawfurd
- Born: Patrick Lindsay; 1646
- Died: October 1681 (aged 34–35)
- Spouse: Margaret Crawfurd (m. 1664; died 1680)
- Children: John Crawford, 1st Viscount of Garnock; Margaret Boyle, Countess of Glasgow; Anne Maule; Magdalen Dundas
- Parent(s): John Lindsay, 17th Earl of Crawford; Lady Margaret Hamilton
- Relatives: John Boyle, 2nd Earl of Glasgow (grandson); John Maule (grandson); Robert Lindsay, 9th Lord Lindsay (grandfather); James Hamilton, 2nd Marquess of Hamilton (grandfather)

The Hon. Patrick Crawfurd (né Lindsay; 1646 – October 1681) of Kilbirnie, was a Scottish aristocrat.

== Early life ==
Born as Patrick Lindsay in 1646, he was the second son of the Treasurer of Scotland, John Lindsay, 10th Lord Lindsay of the Byres, 17th Earl of Crawford, and 1st Earl of Lindsay, and the former Lady Margaret Hamilton. Among his siblings were Lady Anne Lindsay (who married the 1st Duke of Rothes), Lady Christian Lindsay (who married the 4th Earl of Haddington), William Lindsay, 18th Earl of Crawford (who married Lady Mary Johnstone, eldest daughter of the 1st Earl of Hartfell), Lady Helen Lindsay (who married Sir Robert Sinclair, Bt), and Lady Elizabeth Lindsay (who married the 3rd Earl of Northesk).

His paternal grandparents were Robert Lindsay, 9th Lord Lindsay and Lady Christian Hamilton (a daughter of the 1st Earl of Haddington). His maternal grandparents were James Hamilton, 2nd Marquess of Hamilton and Lady Anne Cunningham (fourth daughter of the 7th Earl of Glencairn).

== Career ==
In 1667, Crawfurd purchased the castle, estate, and barony of Glengarnock from Richard Cuninghame, the last of the Cuninghames of Garnock. He had already gained the adjacent barony of Kilbirnie through his marriage with Margaret, second daughter of Sir John Crawford. In 1707, both baronies were united in the Barony of Kilbirnie, with Kilbirnie Place as the principal dwelling.

== Personal life ==
On 27 December 1664, Lindsay married Margaret Crawfurd (c. 1651–1680), younger daughter and co-heiress of Sir John Crawfurd, 1st Baronet of Kilbirnie, and, his second wife, Magdalen Carnegie (the daughter of David Carnegie, styled Lord Carnegie as son and heir apparent of the 1st Earl of Southesk). Her sister, Ann Crawfurd, married Sir Archibald Stewart, 1st Baronet, of Blackhall. Together, they were the parents of:

- John Lindsay-Crawfurd, 1st Viscount Garnock (1669–1708), who married Lady Margaret Stuart, daughter of James Stuart, 1st Earl of Bute and Agnes Mackenzie, in 1697.
- Margaret Lindsay-Crawfurd (1669–1695), who married David Boyle, 1st Earl of Glasgow, son of John Boyle of Kelburn, and Marion Steuart (the daughter of Sir Walter Steuart of Allanton), in 1687.
- Anne Lindsay-Crawfurd (1670–1729), who married Hon. Harry Maule of Kellie, son of George Maule, 2nd Earl of Panmure and Lady Jean Campbell (daughter of the 1st Earl of Loudoun and Margaret Campbell, 2nd Baroness Campbell).
- Magdalen Lindsay-Crawfurd, who married George Dundas of Duddingston, son of John Dundas of Duddingston and Anne Carmichael.

Crawfurd died in October 1681.

=== Descendants ===
Through his daughter Margaret, he was a grandfather of John Boyle, 2nd Earl of Glasgow.

Through his daughter Anne, he was a grandfather of John Maule, MP for Aberdeen Burghs, Jean Maule (who married George, Lord Ramsay (son of the 6th Earl of Dalhousie).

Through his son John, he was a grandfather of Patrick Lindsay-Crawford, 2nd Viscount Garnock.
