= Kilbirnie Auld Kirk =

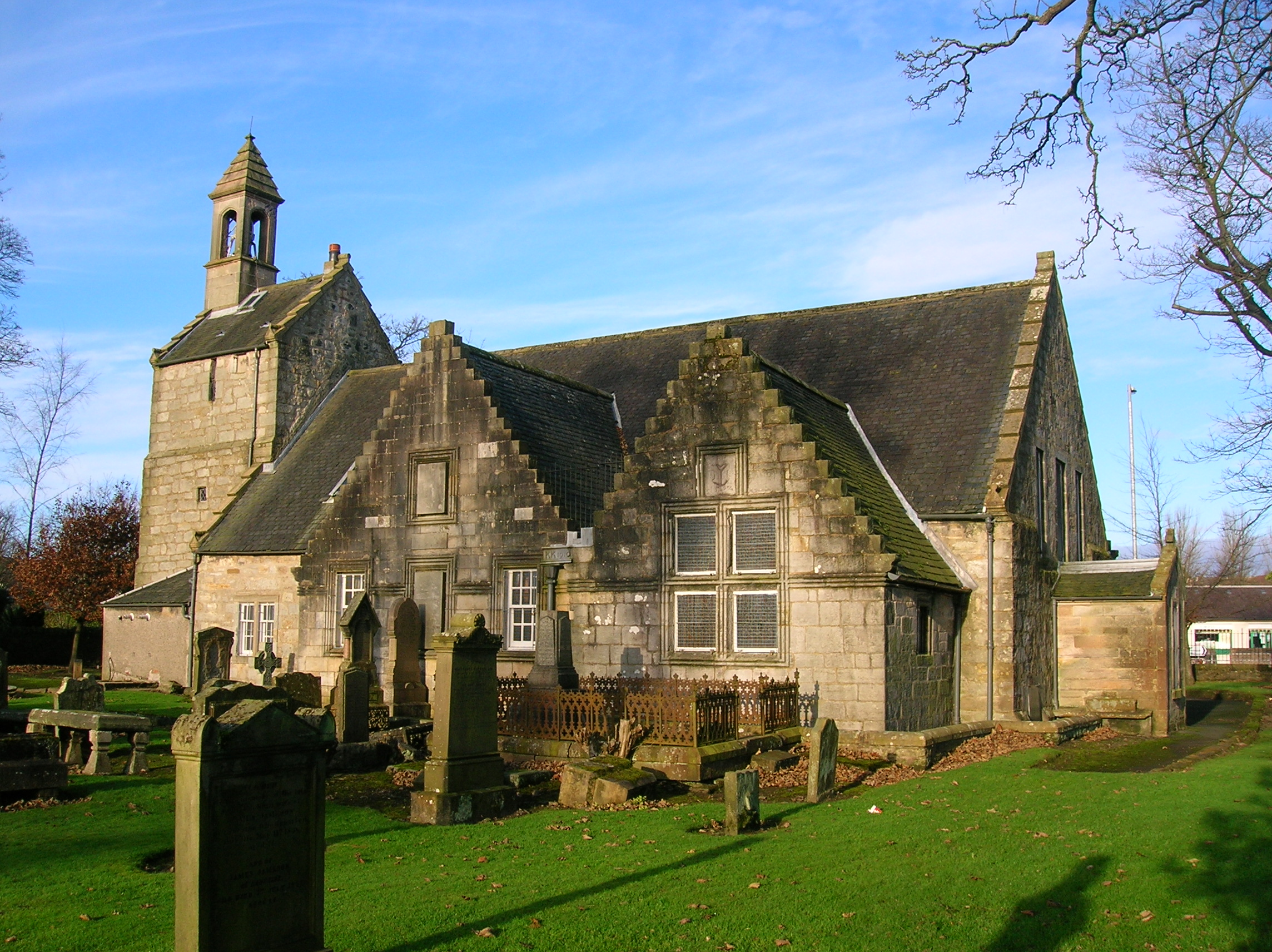
- Kilbirnie Auld Kirk
- 55°44′48″N 4°41′12″W
- Denomination: Church of Scotland
- Churchmanship: Ministers and Elders in C of S
- Website: Auld Kirk

Administration
- Parish: Kilbirnie

Clergy
- Pastor: Session Clerk

Kilbirnie Auld Kirk is a Church of Scotland congregation on Dalry Road (at Kirkland Road), Kilbirnie, North Ayrshire, Scotland. Although the building dates back to the 15th century, the present congregation was formed in 1978 by the amalgamation of the Glengarnock Parish Church and the Barony Church. The building is now closed as a place of worship, and the congregation meet at the united Kilbirnie New Parish Church in Glasgow Street.

== History ==
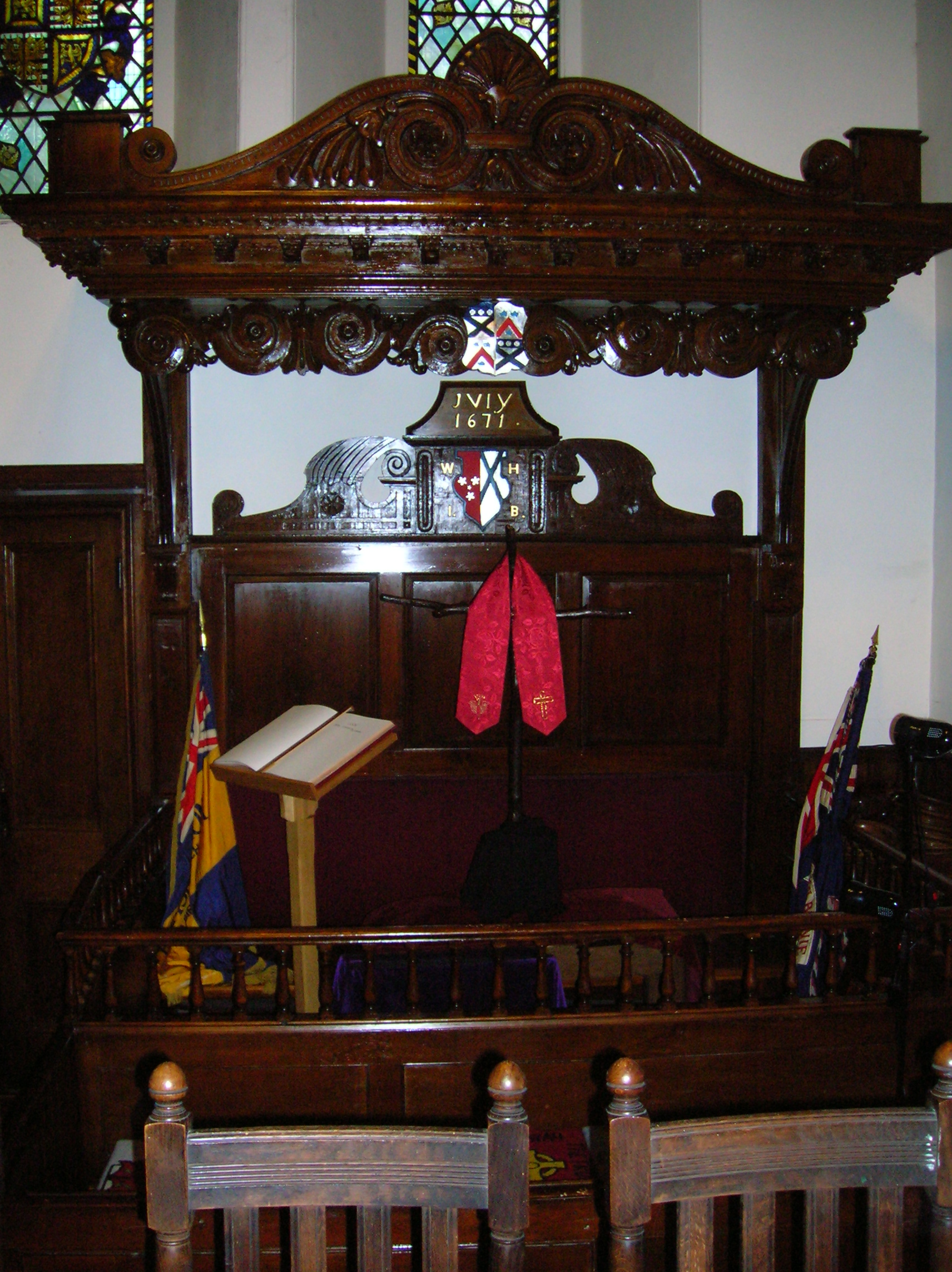
The Ladyland Loft in the Auld Kirk.

Previously known as "The Barony Church", after the barony that had been obtained by John Craufurd of Kilbirnie in 1641, the church is constructed on the site of a 6th-century monastic cell. The town of Kilbirnie derives its name from the church. The name is Gaelic in origin and means "Church of St Brendan" (the Gaelic cil, pronounced 'kil', signifying a church, suffixed by the name of the saint). "Auld Kirk" in Scots simply means Old Church.

The Craufurd tomb contains the effigies of Captain Thomas Craufurd of Jordanhill and his wife Janet ker of Kersland. Thomas died on 3 January 1603 having achieved fame through capturing Dumbarton Castle for King James VI, for which brave achievement he was given the lands of Jordanhill near Glasgow as a reward. The inscription on the tomb reads GOD SCHAW THE RICHT. HEIR LYIS THOMAS CRAUFURD OF IORDANHILL SEXT SON TO LAURENCE CRAUFURD OF KILBIRNY AND IONET KER HIS SPOUS ELDEST DOCHTER TO ROBERT FER OF KERRISLAND 1594.

== Architecture ==
The original nave dates from 1470, with a two-stage bell tower added twenty years later. Aisles were added in 1597 for the Cunninghames of Glengarnock and in 1642 for the Crawfords. A transept and new entrance front were added in 1903–05.

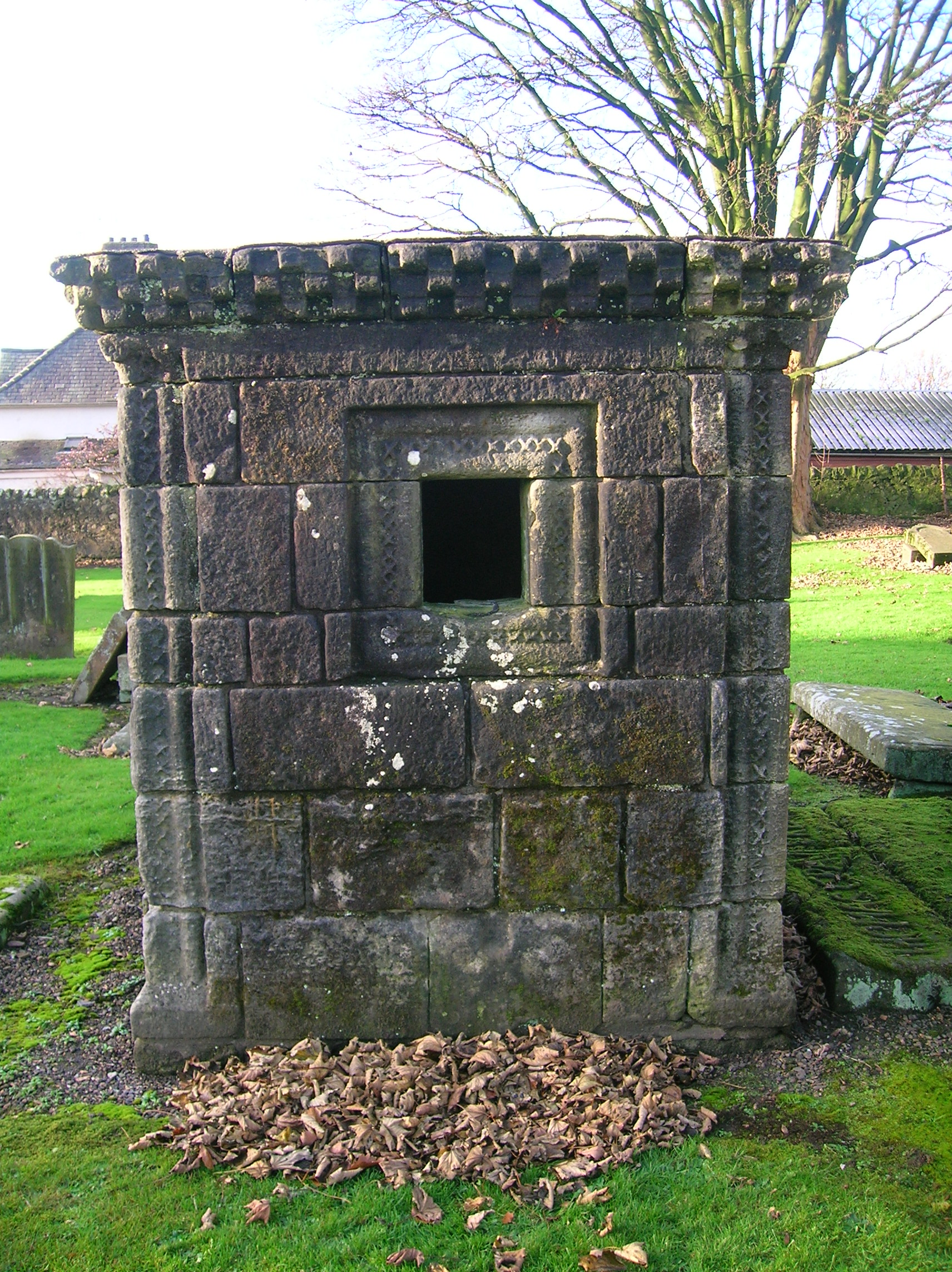
The viewing window in the 1594 tomb of Captain Thomas Crawfurd of Jordanhill.

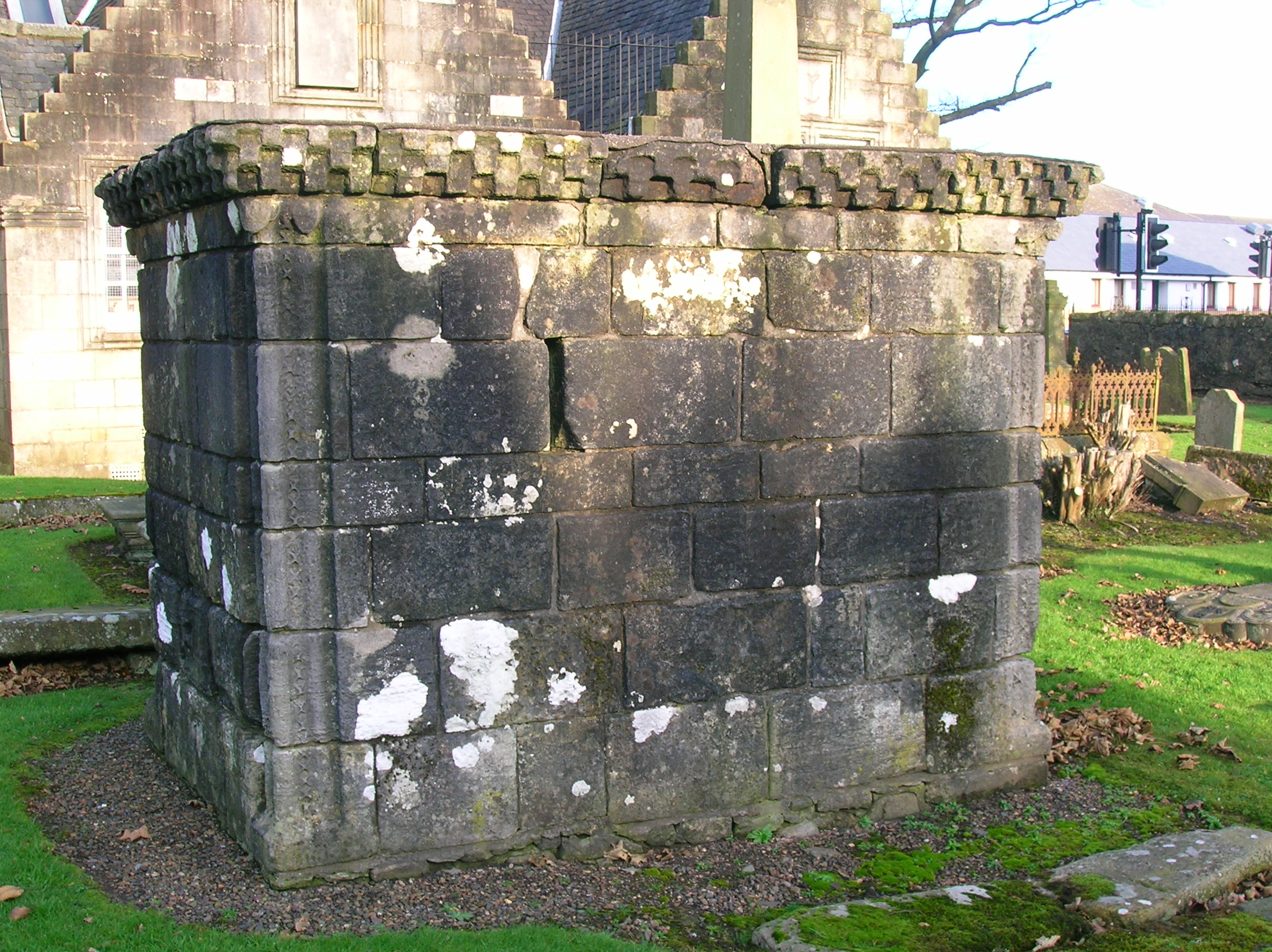
The Crawfurd's tomb with the old Kirk in the background.

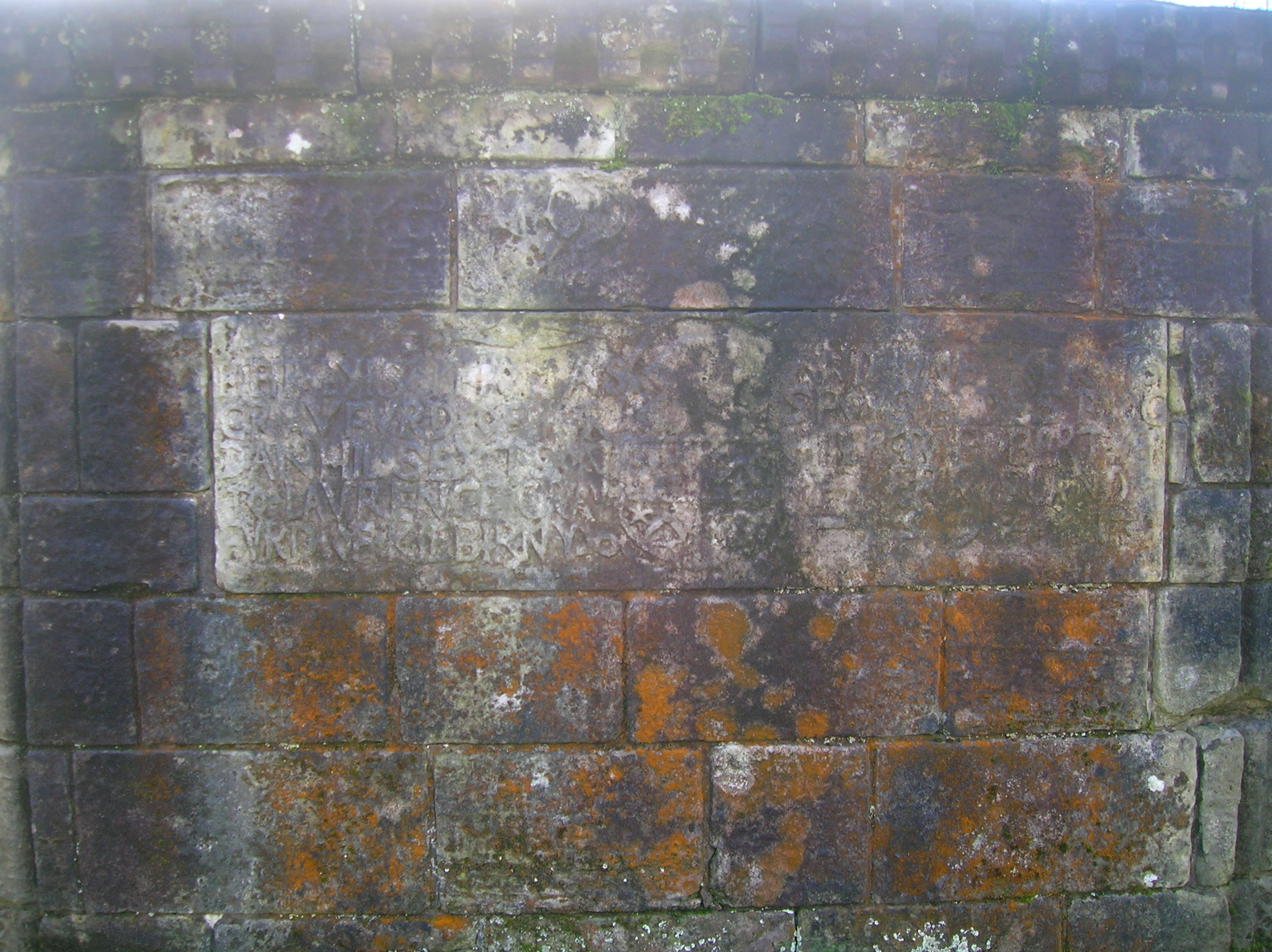
Inscription and Coat of Arms on the Crawford tomb.

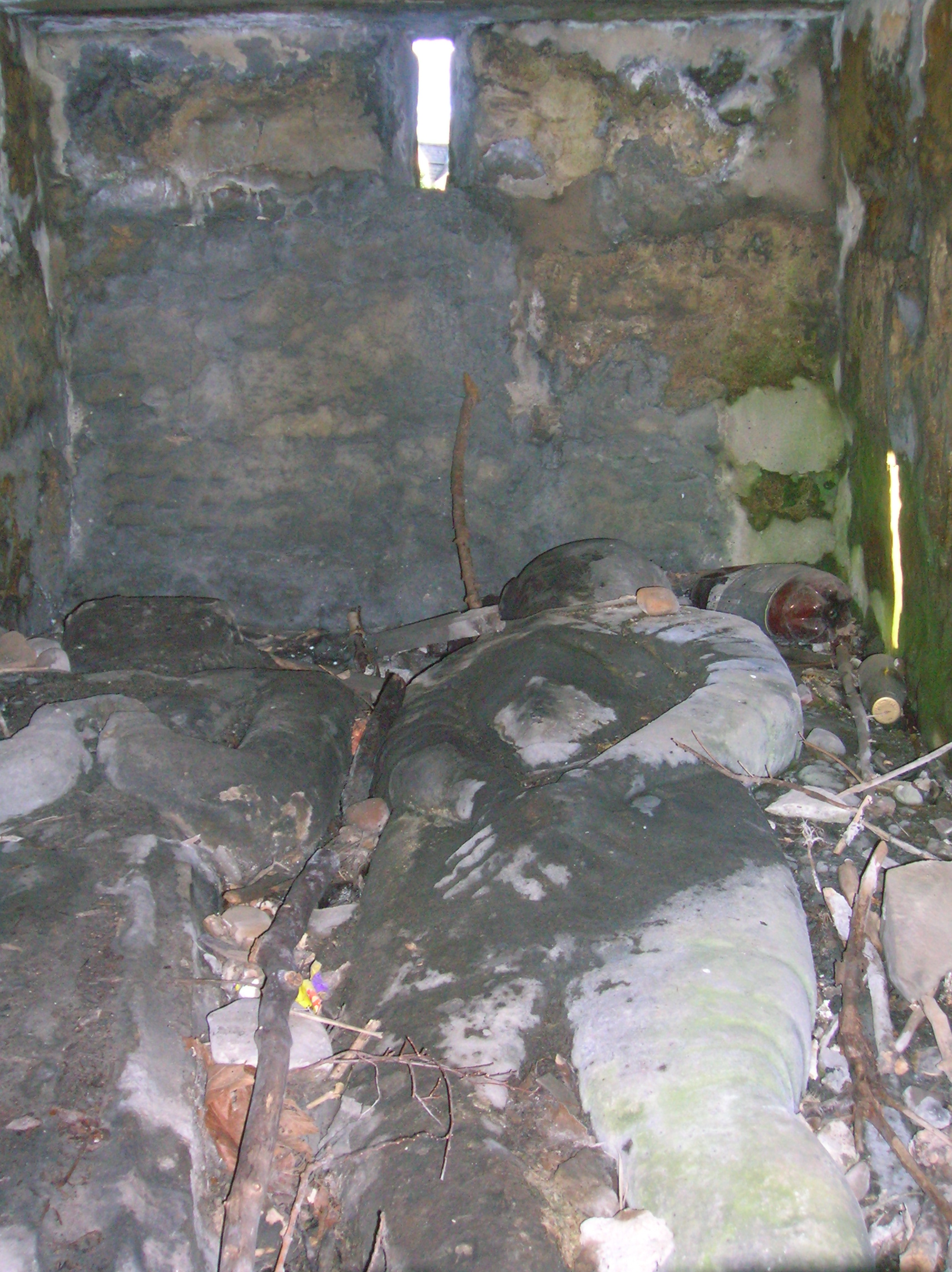
Effigies of Thomas Crawfurd and Janet Kerr.

The church has some magnificent fittings, pride of place going to the elaborately detailed Crawford Loft of circa 1705, and to the 17th-century sounding board above the pulpit. Many of the windows have been decorated in stained glass.

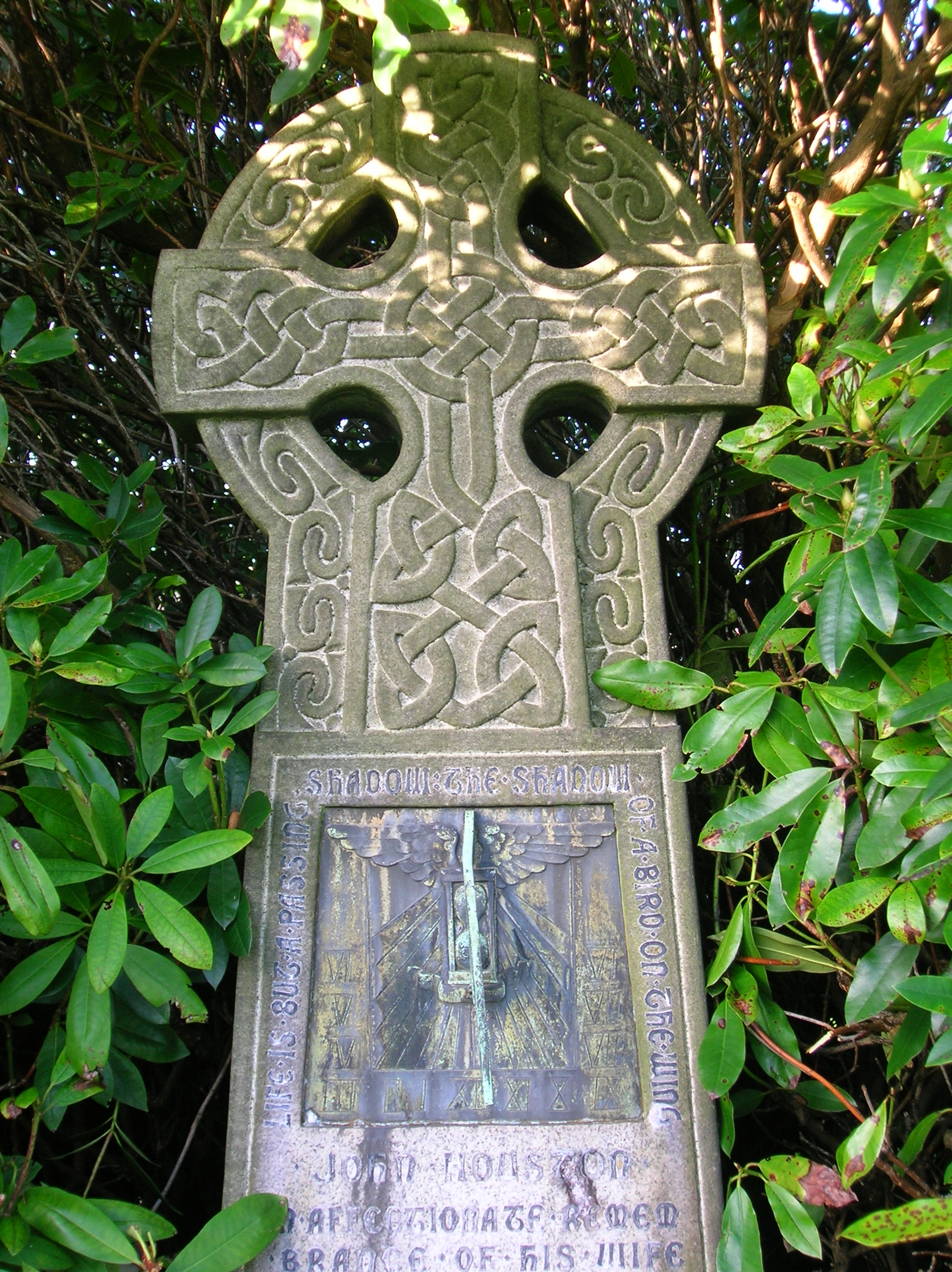
A very unusual gravestone bearing a sundial.

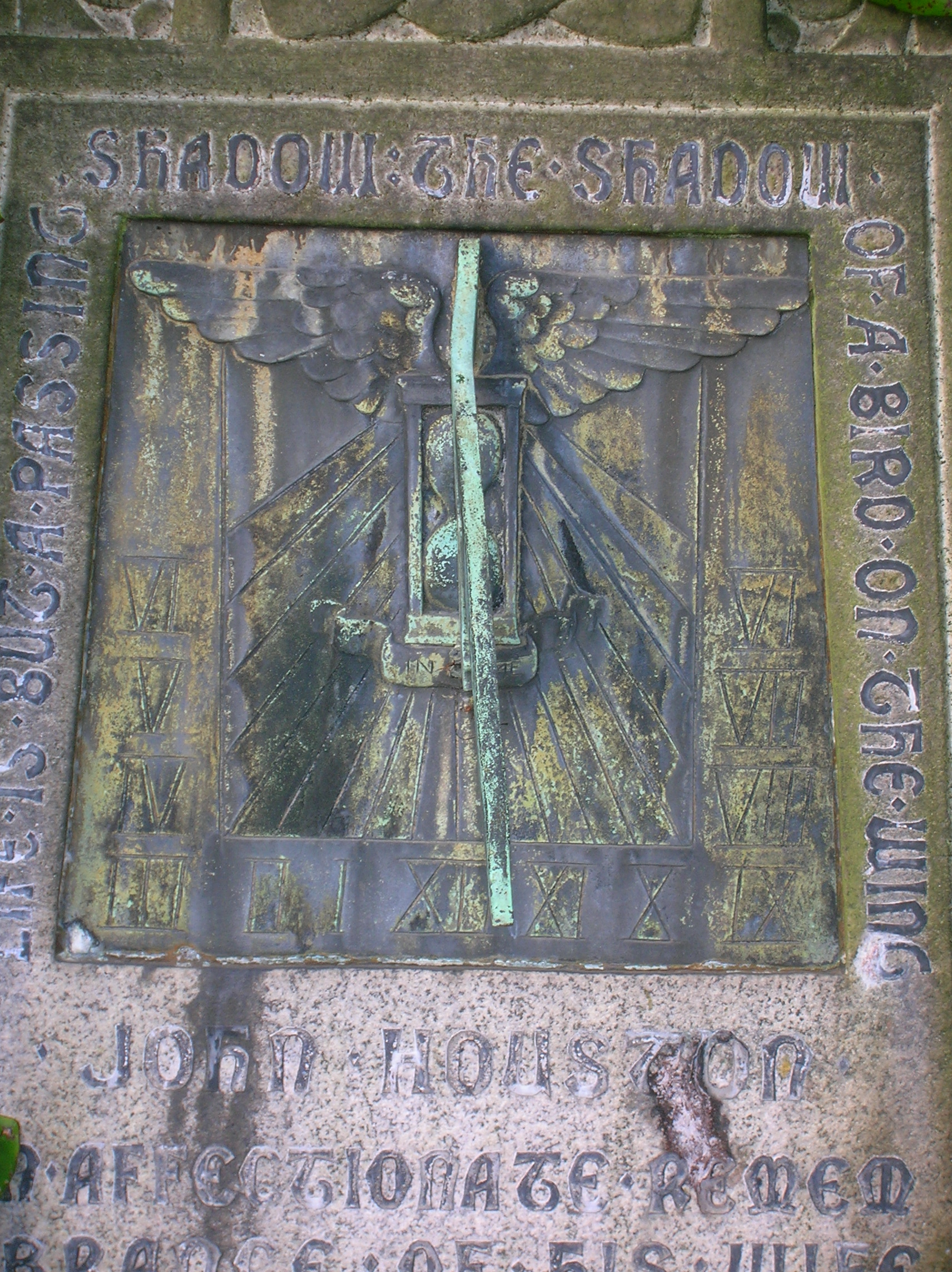
Detail of the sundial's inscription.

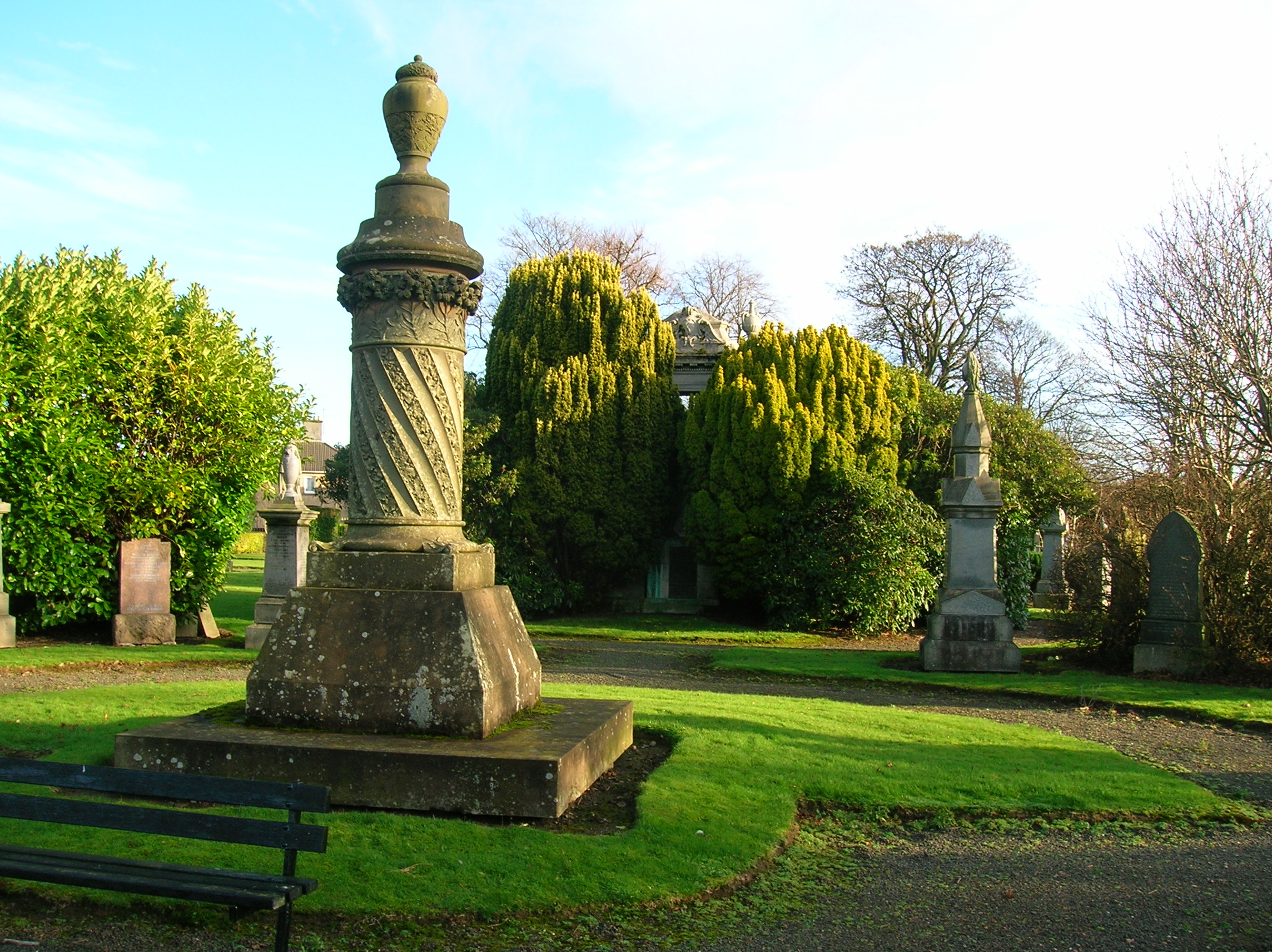
Knox of Place and other memorials.

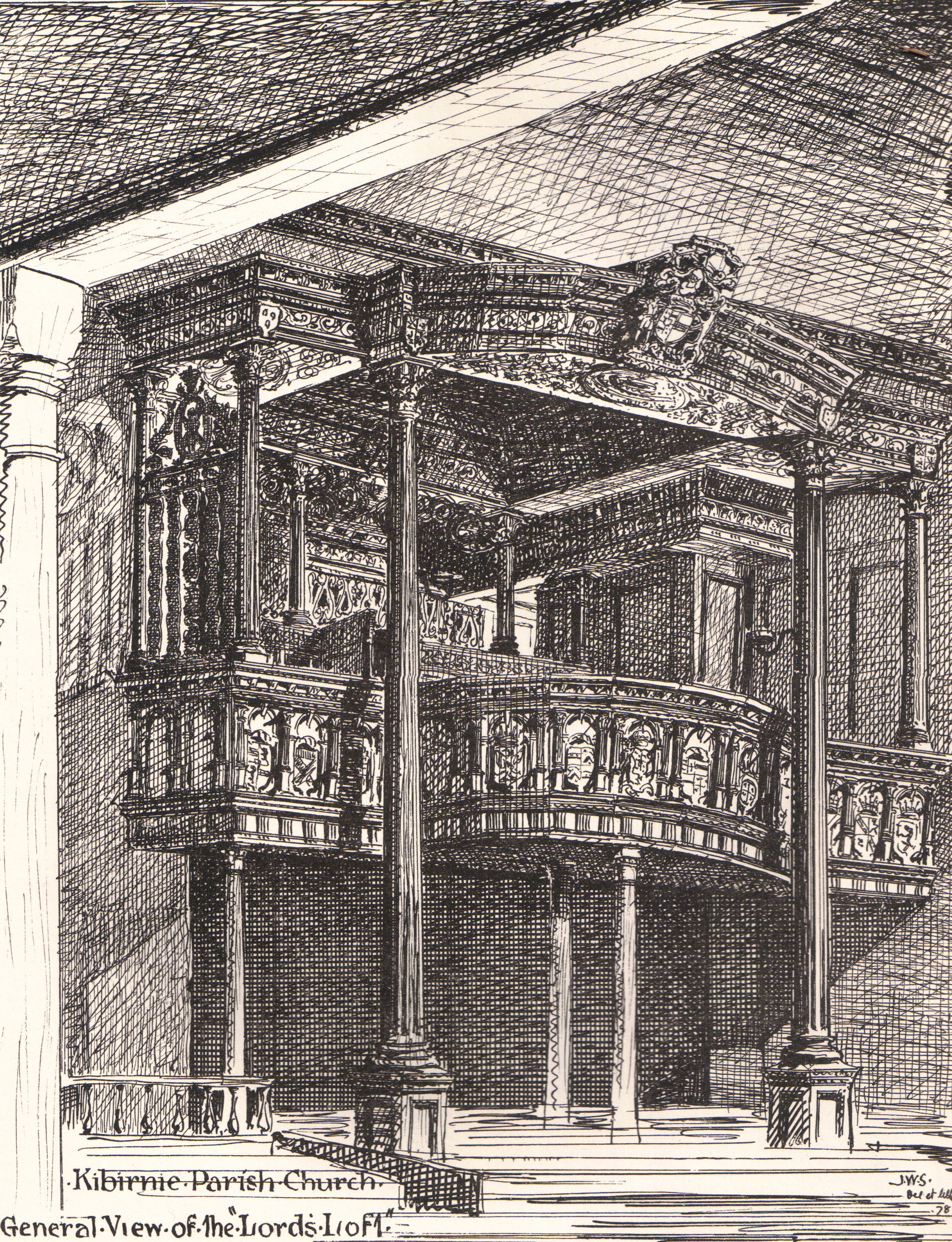
The Lord's Loft

"Kilbirnie Auld Kirk and Cemetery Walls" are a category 'A' listed historic building.

== See also ==
- Birnie Kirk
