= Sir Alexander Cuninghame, 2nd Baronet =

Scottish baronet

Sir Alexander Cuninghame, Bt
- Born: c. 1670
- Died: 1730 (aged 59–60)
- Spouse: Margaret Boyle (m. 1686, died)
- Children: Sir David Cuninghame, 3rd Baronet; Jean Cuninghame Newell
- Parent(s): Sir Alexander Cuninghame, 1st Baronet; Mary Stewart
- Relatives: Sir Archibald Stewart, Bt (uncle)

Sir Alexander Cuninghame, 2nd Baronet (c. 1670 – 1730) was a Scottish landowner and aristocrat.

== Early life ==
Cuninghame was born at Corsehill Castle in Ayrshire, Scotland. He was the only son of Sir Alexander Cuninghame, 1st Baronet and Mary Stewart (sister of Sir Archibald Stewart, 1st Baronet, of Blackhall).

His paternal grandparents were Alexander Cuninghame and Anne (née Crawfurd) Cuninghame (sister to Sir John Crawfurd, 1st Baronet, MP for Ayrshire). Through his paternal line, he was a descendant of the 4th Earl of Glencairn through the Earl's second son, Hon. Andrew Cunningham. His maternal grandparents were John Stewart (the son of Sir Archibald Stewart of Blackhall) (Note: The Stewart family is descended in the direct male line from Sir John Stewart, illegitimate son of King Robert III of Scotland, who granted him the estate of Ardgowan in Renfrewshire.) and Mary Stirling (the daughter of Sir James Stirling and sister to Sir George Stirling, 6th Laird of Keir, Dunblane, Perthshire, and 3rd Laird of Cawder, Bishopbriggs, Lanarkshire). Among his maternal family were uncles, James Stewart of Lumlock and Sir Archibald Stewart, 1st Baronet, of Blackhall (who married his father's first cousin, Ann Crawfurd).

== Career ==
Upon the death of his father on 25 March 1685, he succeeded as the 2nd Baronet Cuninghame of Corsehill in the Baronetage of Nova Scotia. As he was only a minor when his father died, and "was, ill-advisedly, served heir general to his father, 25 March 1685, and heir special in the Barony of Robertland. By this service not only his estate but what of his wife was given up to his father's creditors, and he had to subsist 'by the effects of his industry.'" His father had been ruined by guaranteeing the credit of his spendthrift cousin, Sir David Cuninghame, 4th Baronet of Robertland.

== Personal life ==
In 1686 Cuninghame was married to Margaret Boyle, a daughter of John Boyle of Kelburn, MP for Bute, and Marion Steuart (the daughter of Sir Walter Steuart of Allanton). She was sister to David Boyle, 1st Earl of Glasgow. Together, they were the parents of:

- Sir David Cuninghame, 3rd Baronet (c. 1690–1770), who married Penelope Montgomery, daughter of Margaret Montgomery (a daughter of Alexander Montgomery of Kirktonholm, Lanarkshire) and Alexander Montgomery of Assloss, Ayrshire; (Note: The Montgomery family sold Assloss House (previously Aslois, Sloss or Asloace), near Kilmarnock, in 1725.) she was the niece and heiress of Sir Walter Montgomery, Baronet, of Kirktonholm (descended from the Montgomeries of Skelmorly).
- Jean Boyle Cuninghame (1697–1763), who married William Newall, a son of Adam Newall and Elizabeth Chalmers.

Sir Alexander died in 1730 and was succeeded by his son, David.

=== Descendants ===
Through his son David, he was a grandfather of three boys and one girl, the eldest of whom, Alexander, married Elizabeth Montgomery, and was father of the 4th, 5th and 6th Baronets.

== Notes ==
Baronetage of Nova Scotia
Preceded by Alexander Cuninghame	Baronet (of Corsehill); 1685–1730	Succeeded by David Cuninghame
