= John Crawford, 1st Viscount of Garnock =

Scottish aristocrat and politician

The Right Honourable The Viscount of Garnock PC

Member of the Parliament of Scotland for Ayrshire
- In office 1693–1703 Serving with Francis Montgomerie, William Mure, John Campbell, Hugh Buntine
- Preceded by: Sir James Montgomerie; Francis Montgomerie; William Mure; Hugh Buntine
- Succeeded by: Francis Montgomerie; William Dalrymple; Sir Hugh Cathcart; John Brisbane

Personal details
- Born: John Crawfurd; 12 May 1669
- Died: 24 December 1708 (aged 39)
- Spouse: Lady Margaret Stuart (m. 1697; died 1708)
- Relations: Sir John Crawfurd, 1st Baronet (grandfather); John Lindsay, 17th Earl of Crawford (grandfather)
- Children: Patrick Lindsay-Crawford, 2nd Viscount of Garnock; Margaret MacNeal
- Parent(s): Patrick Crawfurd; Margaret Crawfurd

John Crawford, 1st Viscount of Garnock PC (12 May 1669 – 24 December 1708) was a Scottish politician and aristocrat.

== Early life ==
John Crawfurd was born on 12 May 1669. He was the eldest son of Hon. Patrick Crawfurd (né Lindsay) and Margaret Crawfurd. Among his siblings were Margaret Lindsay-Crawfurd (who married David Boyle, 1st Earl of Glasgow), Anne Lindsay-Crawfurd (who married Hon. Harry Maule of Kellie, son of the 2nd Earl of Panmure), and Magdalen Lindsay-Crawfurd (who married George Dundas of Duddingston).

His paternal grandparents were John Lindsay, 17th Earl of Crawford, and the former Lady Margaret Hamilton (a daughter of the 2nd Marquess of Hamilton). Among his extended paternal family was uncle William Lindsay, 18th Earl of Crawford, and aunts Anne Leslie, Duchess of Rothes (wife of the 1st Duke of Rothes), Lady Christian Lindsay (wife of the 4th Earl of Haddington), Lady Helen Lindsay (wife of Sir Robert Sinclair, Bt), and Lady Elizabeth Lindsay (wife of the 3rd Earl of Northesk). His maternal grandparents were Sir John Crawfurd, 1st Baronet of Kilbirnie, and, his second wife, Magdalen Carnegie (the daughter of David Carnegie, styled Lord Carnegie as son and heir apparent of the 1st Earl of Southesk). His maternal aunt, Ann Crawfurd, was the wife of Sir Archibald Stewart, 1st Baronet, of Blackhall.

== Career ==
He held the office of Member of the Parliament of Scotland for Ayrshire between 1693 and 1703. He was appointed Privy Counsellor.

He was created the 1st Lord Kilbirnie, Kingsburn and Drumry, as well as the 1st Viscount of Mount Crawford in the Peerage of Scotland on 10 April 1703. On 26 November 1703, he was created 1st Lord Kilbirnie and Drumry, and 1st Viscount Garnock in the Peerage of Scotland, as replacements of the April title.

== Personal life ==
In January 1697, he married Lady Margaret Stuart (d. 1738), daughter of James Stuart, 1st Earl of Bute and, his first wife, Agnes Mackenzie (eldest daughter of Sir George Mackenzie of Rosehaugh, Lord Advocate). Together, they were the parents of:

- Patrick Lindsay-Crawford, 2nd Viscount of Garnock (1697–1735), who married Margaret Home, daughter of George Home of Kello, Berwickshire, in 1720.
- Margaret Lindsay-Crawford (b. c. 1700), who married MacNeal of Ugadale.

Lord Garnock died on 24 December 1708, at age 39. His widow, the dowager Lady Garnock, died on 27 April 1738).

=== Descendants ===
Through his son Patrick, he was a grandfather of John Lindsay-Crawford, 3rd Viscount of Garnock (1722–1739) and George Lindsay-Crawford (1723–1781), who succeeded John Lindsay as 21st Earl of Crawford and 5th Earl of Lindsay in 1749.

Parliament of Scotland
Preceded by Sir James Montgomerie; Francis Montgomerie; William Mure; Hugh Buntine	Shire Commissioner for Ayrshire; 1693–1703; With: Francis Montgomerie; William Mure; John Campbell; Hugh Buntine	Succeeded by Francis Montgomerie; William Dalrymple; Sir Hugh Cathcart; John Brisbane
Peerage of Scotland
New creation	Viscount of Garnock; 1703–1708	Succeeded by Patrick Lindsay-Crawford
