= Sir Alexander Cuninghame, 1st Baronet =

Scottish aristocrat

Sir Alexander Cuninghame, Bt
- Born: c. 1643
- Died: March 1685 (aged 41–42)
- Spouse: Mary Stewart (m. 1665; died 1683)
- Children: Sir Alexander Cuninghame, 2nd Baronet
- Parent(s): Alexander Cuninghame; Anne Crawfurd
- Relatives: Sir John Crawfurd, 1st Baronet (uncle); Sir David Cuninghame, 3rd Baronet (grandson)

Sir Alexander Cuninghame, 1st Baronet (c. 1643 – March 1685) was a Scottish landowner and aristocrat.

== Early life ==
Cuninghame was born in c. 1643. He was the only son of Alexander Cuninghame (1625–c. 1646) and Anne Crawfurd (1628–1649). His sister, Margaret Cuninghame, was the wife of George Meikle of Lesmahagow.

His paternal grandparents were Alexander Cuninghame, 5th Laird of Corsehill (son of Alexander Cuninghame, 4th of Corsehill), and Mary Houstoun (a daughter of John Houstoun of Houston). Through his paternal line, he was a great-great-great-grandson of the 4th Earl of Glencairn through the Earl's second son, Hon. Andrew Cunningham. His maternal grandparents were John Crawfurd of Kilbirnie and Lady Mary Cuninghame (a daughter of the 7th Earl of Glencairn). Through his maternal uncle, Sir John Crawfurd, 1st Baronet, MP for Ayrshire, he was a first cousin of Margaret Crawfurd (wife of Hon. Patrick Crawford, son of the 17th Earl of Crawford) and Ann Crawfurd (wife of Sir Archibald Stewart, 1st Baronet, of Blackhall).

== Career ==
In 1663, his grandfather settled the family estate of Corsehill on him and his affianced wife, reserving to himself the life rent (though he died shortly thereafter in 1667). Reportedly, he was ruined by guaranteeing the credit of his spendthrift cousin, Sir David Cuninghame, 4th Baronet of Robertland. (Note: Upon the death of Sir David Cuninghame, 4th Baronet in c. 1708, the baronetcy became dormant until it was successfully claimed, in 1778, by William Cuninghame, great-great-grandson of Sir David Cuninghame, grandfather of the first Baronet.)

A Scottish baron and landowner in Dumfriesshire, on 26 February 1672, he was created the 1st Baronet Cuninghame of Corsehill in the Baronetage of Nova Scotia, with remainder to heirs male of the body.

== Personal life ==
In c. 1665, he married Mary Stewart (1647–1683), a daughter of John Stewart (the son of Sir Archibald Stewart of Blackhall) (Note: The Stewart family is descended in the direct male line from Sir John Stewart, illegitimate son of King Robert III of Scotland, who granted him the estate of Ardgowan in Renfrewshire.) and Mary Stirling (the daughter of Sir James Stirling and sister to Sir George Stirling, 6th Laird of Keir, Dunblane, Perthshire, and 3rd Laird of Cawder, Bishopbriggs, Lanarkshire). Among her siblings were James Stewart of Lumlock and Sir Archibald Stewart, 1st Baronet, of Blackhall (who married Sir Alexander's first cousin, Ann Crawfurd). Together, they were the parents of:

- Sir Alexander Cuninghame, 2nd Baronet (d. 1730), who married Margaret Boyle, a daughter of John Boyle of Kelburn, MP for Bute, in 1686. Her brother was David Boyle, 1st Earl of Glasgow.

Sir Alexander died on 25 March 1685 and was succeeded by his only son, Alexander. (Note: Sir Alexander Cuninghame, 2nd Baronet was a minor when his father died, and "was, ill-advisedly, served heir general to his father, 25 March 1685, and heir special in the Barony of Robertland. By this service not only his estate but what of his wife was given up to his father's creditors, and he had to subsist 'by the effects of his industry.'")

=== Descendants ===
Through his son Alexander, he was a grandfather of Sir David Cuninghame, 3rd Baronet, who married Penelope Montgomery by whom he had three sons and a daughter, the eldest of whom, Alexander, married Elizabeth Montgomery, and was father of the 4th, 5th and 6th Baronets.

== Notes ==
Baronetage of Nova Scotia
New creation	Baronet (of Corsehill); 1672–1685	Succeeded by Alexander Cuninghame
