= Sir David Cuninghame, 3rd Baronet =

Scottish aristocrat

Sir David Cuninghame, Bt
- Born: c. 1690; Scotland
- Died: July 4, 1770 (aged 79–80); Corsehill, East Ayrshire, Scotland
- Spouse: Penelope Montgomery
- Children: 4
- Parent(s): Sir Alexander Cuninghame, 2nd Baronet; Margaret Boyle
- Relatives: David Boyle, 1st Earl of Glasgow (uncle); Sir Alexander Cuninghame, 1st Baronet (grandfather)

Sir David Cuninghame, 3rd Baronet (c. 1690 – 4 July 1770) was a Scottish landowner and aristocrat.

== Early life ==
Cuninghame was born in Scotland in c. 1690. He was the only son and heir of Sir Alexander Cuninghame, 2nd Baronet (died 1730) and the former Margaret Boyle. His sister, Jean Cuninghame, married William Newall (a son of Adam Newall). His father was only a minor when his father, the 1st Baronet, died, and "was, ill-advisedly, served heir general to his father" and "heir special in the Barony of Robertland. By this service not only his estate but what of his wife was given up to his father's creditors, and he had to subsist 'by the effects of his industry.'"

His paternal grandparents were Sir Alexander Cuninghame, 1st Baronet, (Note: Sir Alexander Cuninghame, 1st Baronet had been ruined by guaranteeing the credit of his spendthrift cousin, Sir David Cuninghame, 4th Baronet of Robertland.) and Mary Stewart (sister of Sir Archibald Stewart, 1st Baronet, of Blackhall). (Note: The Stewart family is descended in the direct male line from Sir John Stewart, illegitimate son of King Robert III of Scotland, who granted him the estate of Ardgowan in Renfrewshire.) Through his paternal line, he was separately a descendant of the 4th Earl of Glencairn through the Earl's second son, Hon. Andrew Cunningham, and the 7th Earl of Glencairn, through the Earl's daughter, Lady Mary Cuninghame. His maternal grandparents were John Boyle of Kelburn, MP for Bute, and Marion Steuart (the daughter of Sir Walter Steuart of Allanton). His maternal uncle was David Boyle, 1st Earl of Glasgow.

== Career ==
Upon the death of his father in 1730, he succeeded as the 3rd Baronet Cuninghame of Corsehill in the Baronetage of Nova Scotia.

== Personal life ==
Sir David married Penelope Montgomery (d. c. 1743), daughter of Margaret Montgomery (a daughter of Alexander Montgomery of Kirktonholm, Lanarkshire) and Alexander Montgomery of Assloss, Ayrshire. (Note: The Montgomery family sold Assloss House (previously Aslois, Sloss or Asloace), near Kilmarnock, in 1725.) Penelope was the niece and heiress of Sir Walter Montgomery, Baronet, of Kirktonholm (descended from the Montgomeries of Skelmorly). Together, they were the parents of:

- Alexander Montgomery-Cuninghame (died 1770), (Note: His surname was legally changed to Montgomery-Cuninghame on inheriting Kirktonholm, the Lanarkshire estate, from his mother (through her uncle, Sir Walter Montgomery).) a captain in the army who served in the wars in Flanders; he married Elizabeth Montgomery, eldest daughter and heiress of David Montgomery of Lainshaw, Ayrshire.
- David Cuninghame, who died in Jamaica.
- Walter Cuninghame.
- Margaret Cuninghame, who married a Craig.

Sir David died at Corsehill in July 1770. As his eldest son predeceased him by about six months, he was succeeded in his title by grandson, Walter Montgomery-Cuninghame.

=== Descendants ===
Through his son Alexander, he was a grandfather of Sir Walter Montgomery-Cuninghame, 4th Baronet, Sir David Montgomery-Cuninghame, 5th Baronet and Sir James Montgomery-Cuninghame, 6th Baronet.

== Notes ==
Baronetage of Nova Scotia
Preceded by Alexander Cuninghame	Baronet (of Corsehill); 1730–1770	Succeeded by Walter Montgomery-Cuninghame
