= Francis Montgomerie =

Scottish politician

Francis Montgomerie (1645–c. 1728) of Giffen, Ayr was a Scottish politician who sat in the Parliament of Scotland from 1689 to 1707 and in the British House of Commons from 1707 to 1710.

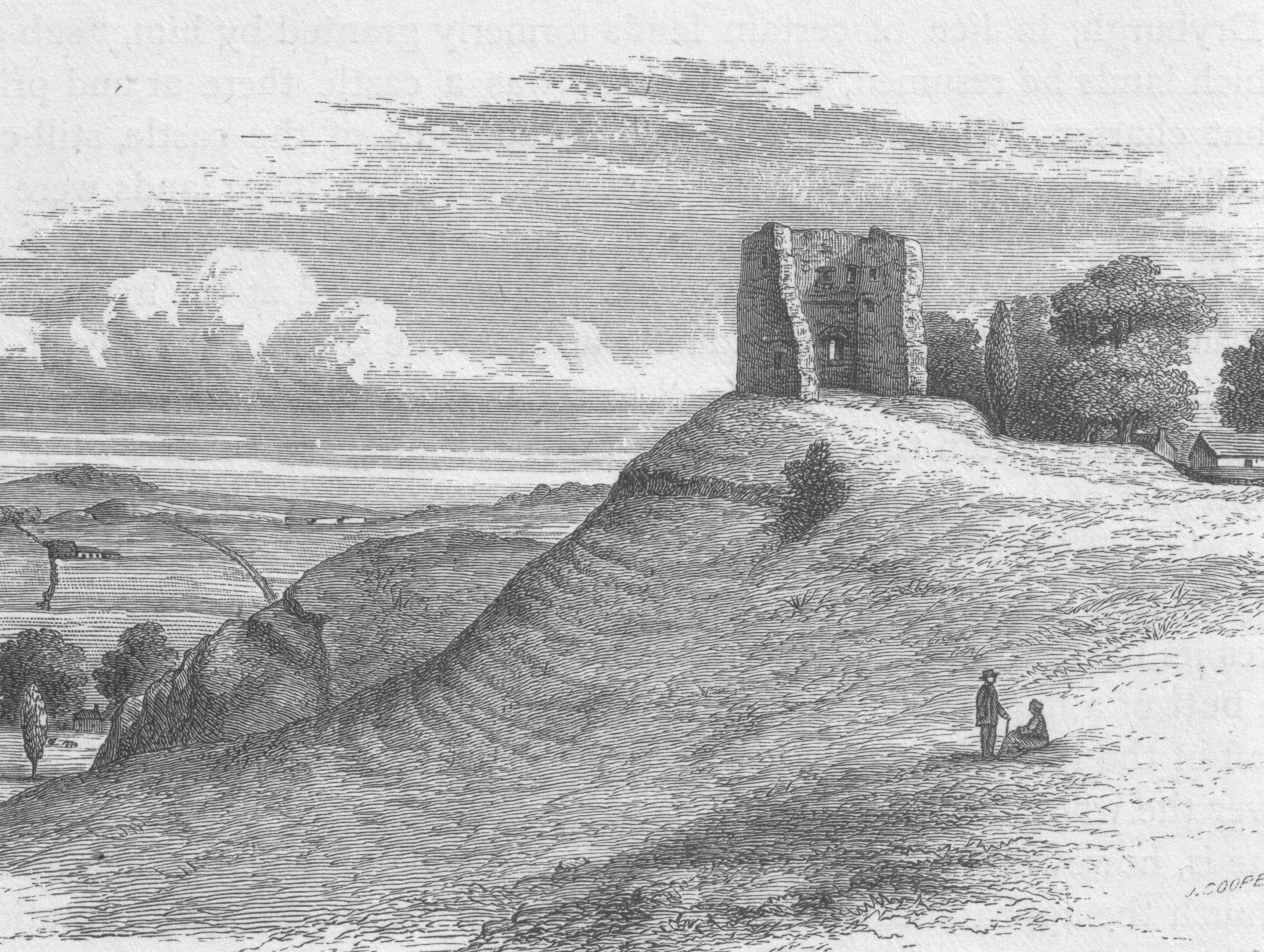
Ruins of Giffen Castle

== Life ==
Montgomerie was the second son of Hugh Montgomerie, 7th Earl of Eglinton and his second wife Lady Mary Leslie, daughter of John Leslie, 6th Earl of Rothes. He was educated at Glasgow University in 1665.

Montgomerie was returned as Shire Commissioner for Ayrshire in 1689. He was a member of the Scottish Privy Council from 1692 to 1708. In 1695 he was one of the founders of the Company of Scotland and in 1696 was appointed one of the Directors. Also in 1695, he was appointed Commissioner for auditing Treasury accounts. In 1696 he was appointed Governor of Dumbarton Castle and freeman of Dumbarton. He was Commissioner for Admiralty accounts in 1698 and was a Commissioner Justiciary for Highlands in 1701 and 1702. From1703 to 1708, he was Commissioner for the Scottish Treasury and from 1706 to 1707, a Commissioner for union with England.

As one of the main shareholders of the Company of Scotland (1695) he lost a small fortune in their ill-advised Darien scheme which planned to form a Scottish colony in Panama. His signature appears on the Act of Union 1707 which compensated the shareholders for their loss. This partially offest the issue that he was not compensated for the loss of his senior roles in the Scottish Parliament.

In 1697 he was Commissioner in the witch investigations linked to Christian Shaw.

In 1707, Montgomerie was one of the Scottish representatives to the first Parliament of Great Britain. He was returned as Member of Parliament for Ayrshire at the 1708 British general election. At the 1710 British general election, he withdrew from the election in favour of his son John who succeeded him as MP for Ayrshire.

The date of Montgomerie's death is unknown, but it preceded the sale of the Giffen estate in 1725. He had two sons, one of whom predeceased him, and two daughters.

== Family ==
His uncle, John Leslie the 7th Earl, had a sickly ward, Margaret Leslie, his cousin, and daughter of Alexander Leslie, 2nd Earl of Leven, with whom he arranged a marriage for Montgomerie. Montgomerie married her under a financially advantageous contract dated 10 October 1673 which incurred a legal dispute when she died a year later in 1674. The initial contract allowed him £10,000 of his wife's estate (£2.4 million in 2022 terms) plus an annual annuity of £600.

On 26 September 1679, he married as his second wife Elizabeth Sinclair, widow of Sir James Primrose who died in 1702, and daughter of Sir Robert Sinclair, 1st Baronet of Longformacus, Berwickshire.

His children were:

- Lt Col John Montgomerie
- Col Alexander Montgomerie who fought at the Battle of Almansa
- Elizabeth Montgomerie, who married Col Patrick Ogilvy of Lonmay

Parliament of Scotland
Preceded by William Blair of Blair; Sir James Montgomerie	Shire Commissioner for Ayrshire; 1695–1707; With: Sir James Montgomerie; William Mure of Rowallan; Hugh Buntine; John Crawford; John Campbell; William Dalrymple; Sir Hugh Cathcart; John Crawford; John Brisbane	Succeeded by Parliament of Great Britain
Parliament of Great Britain
New parliament	Member of Parliament for Scotland; 1707–1708	Constituency split
New constituency	Member of Parliament for Ayrshire; 1708–1710	Succeeded by John Montgomerie
