= William Dalrymple (politician, born 1678) =

Scottish Whig politician

William Dalrymple (1678 – 30 November 1744) was a Scottish Whig politician who sat in the Parliament of Scotland from 1702 to 1707 and in the British House of Commons between 1707 and 1741.

Dalrymple was baptized on 11 October 1678, the fifth but second surviving son of John Dalrymple, 1st Earl of Stair and his wife Elizabeth Dundas daughter of Sir James Dundas of Newliston, Linlithgow. He married his cousin Penelope, suo jure Countess of Dumfries daughter of Charles, Lord Crichton on 26 February 1698.

Dalrymple was a Shire commissioner for Ayrshire in the Parliament of Scotland from 1702 to 1707. He was a court representative there who made little contribution. He was appointed joint muster master general for Scotland in 1706. He followed the Court line faithfully over the Union, and was appointed a commissioner of the Equivalent in 1707 and as one of the Scottish representatives to the first Parliament of Great Britain from 1707 to 1708. At the 1708 British general election he was returned in a fierce contest as Member of Parliament for Clackmannanshire. He was supported by Lord Mar, the principal magnate in the shire, who was said to have created some 'fictitious votes' for him. There was a petition but it was ignored. He was Sheriff of Clackmannan from 1708 to his death. In February 1709 Dalrymple was granted a vacant company in the 3rd Foot Guards (Scots Guards), at the request of his father. He probably did not go to Spain with his regiment, and so avoided its surrender at the Battle of Brihuega. He continued to support the Court in Parliament and presented documents from the Equivalent commissioners on 3 March 1709. In 1710 he voted for the impeachment of Dr Sacheverell. Clackmannanshire did not elect at the 1710 British general election and Dalrymple was no longer on good terms with Mar by the time of the 1713 British general election.

At the 1722 British general election Dalrymple was returned as MP for Wigtown Burghs on his family's interest. He continued to support the Administration. At the 1727 British general election he was returned as MP for both Wigtown Boroughs and for Wigtownshire and chose to sit for Wigtownshire. He went into opposition in 1733 with his brother, the 2nd Earl of Stair, and stayed there. He was returned again at the 1734 British general election.

Dalrymple died on 30 November 1744. He had six sons and two daughters. His eldest surviving son, William, had succeeded to his mother's title as Earl of Dumfries. His second son, James, inherited the earldom of Stair in 1747, which on his death in 1760 also passed to William.

Parliament of Scotland
Preceded by Francis Montgomerie; Hugh Buntine; John Crawford; John Campbell	Shire Commissioner for Ayr; 1702–1707; With: Francis Montgomerie 1702–1707; Sir Hugh Cathcart 1702–1707; John Crawford 1702–1703; John Brisbane 1704–1707	Succeeded by Parliament of Great Britain
Parliament of Great Britain
New constituency Created by Act of Union	Member of Parliament for Clackmannanshire; 1708–1710	Vacant Alternating constituency Title next held by Sir John Erskine, Bt
Preceded by Sir Patrick Vanse	Member of Parliament for Wigtown Burghs; 1722–1728	Succeeded by John Dalrymple
Preceded by John Stewart	Member of Parliament for Wigtownshire; 1727–1741	Succeeded by James Stewart
