= Kelburn =

Kelburn may refer to:

- Kelburn Castle, Scottish castle
- Kelburn, New Zealand, suburb of Wellington
- Viscount of Kelburn, a title created for David Boyle, 1st Earl of Glasgow and used by his heirs.
