= Sir John Crawfurd, 1st Baronet =

Scottish landowner and politician (c. 1619-1662)

Sir John Crawfurd, Bt

Member of the Parliament of Scotland for Ayrshire
- In office 10 April 1644 – 3 June 1644 Serving with Sir William Mure
- Preceded by: Sir William Mure; James Fullarton
- Succeeded by: Sir Hugh Campbell; William Cochrane

Personal details
- Born: c. 1619; Kilbirnie Castle, Ayrshire, Scotland
- Died: 1662; Edinburgh, Scotland
- Spouse(s): Margaret Balfour; Magdalen Carnegie
- Relations: James Cunningham, 7th Earl of Glencairn (grandfather); William Cunningham, 8th Earl of Glencairn (uncle); Lady Ann Cunningham (aunt); Lady Margaret Cunningham (aunt); Sir Alexander Cuninghame, 1st Baronet (nephew)
- Children: Ann, Lady Stewart; Margaret Crawfurd-Lindsay
- Parent(s): John Crawfurd; Lady Mary Cunningham

Sir John Crawfurd, 1st Baronet, of Kilbirnie (c. 1619 – 1662) was a Scottish landowner and politician.

== Early life ==
Crawfurd, a member of Clan Crawford, was the eldest son, and heir, of John Crawfurd of Kilbirnie (1606–1629) and Lady Mary Cunningham. Among his siblings were Robert Crawfurd, Margaret Crawfurd (wife of Col. William Crawford), James Crawfurd, Ann Crawfurd (wife of Alexander Cunningham of Corsehill), Helen Crawfurd, and Agnes Crawfurd (wife of Thomas Findlay).

His paternal grandparents were John Crawfurd of Kilbirnie and Margaret Blair (a daughter of John Blair). Through his sister, Ann, he was uncle to Sir Alexander Cuninghame, 1st Baronet. His maternal grandparents were James Cunningham, 7th Earl of Glencairn and the former Margaret Campbell (a daughter of Sir Colin Campbell of Glenorchy). Among his maternal family were uncle William Cunningham, 8th Earl of Glencairn, and aunts Lady Ann Cunningham (wife of James Hamilton, 2nd Marquess of Hamilton), Lady Margaret Cunningham (wife of Sir James Hamilton of Evandale and Libberton) and Lady Catherine Cunningham (wife of Sir John Cunningham of Glengarnock).

== Career ==
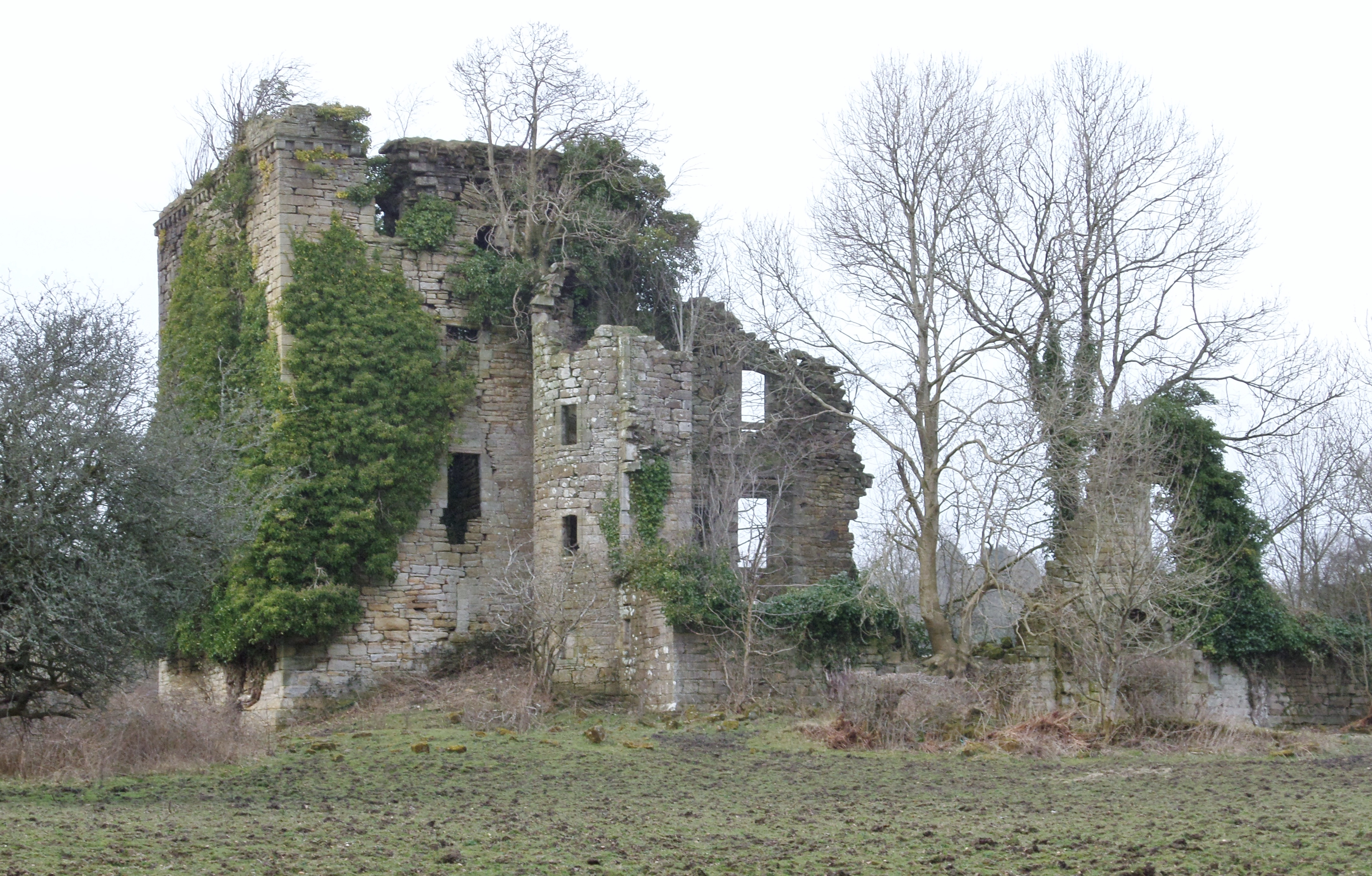
Ruins of Kilbirnie Castle

Crawfurd was knighted by King Charles I, and took part in the Civil Wars as Commander of the Royalist Regiment of Foot.

He was created 1st Baronet Crawfurd, of Kilbirnie, Ayrshire, in the Baronetage of Nova Scotia on 14 May 1628 (though some sources say 1642), with, presumably, remainder to heirs male whatsoever, but the creation is not in the Great Seal Register or in the Registrum Preceptorum Cartarum pro Baronettis Novæ Scotiæ, neither is there record of any grant or seizin of lands in Nova Scotia. He served as a Member of Parliament of Scotland for Ayrshire in 1644.

== Personal life ==
Crawfurd married Hon. Margaret Balfour (1606–c. 1640), daughter of Robert Balfour, Lord Balfour of Burleigh and Margaret Balfour, suo jure Lady Balfour of Burleigh, a title in the Peerage of Scotland. She died in c. 1640; they had no issue.

After her death, he married Magdalen (née Carnegie) Baillie, Lady Baillie, the widow of Sir Gideon Baillie, 1st Baronet of Lochend, who died in 1640. She was daughter of David Carnegie, styled Lord Carnegie (as son and heir apparent of David Carnegie, 1st Earl of Southesk) and Lady Margaret Hamilton (a daughter of Thomas Hamilton, 1st Earl of Haddington). After Lord Carnegie died in 1633, Magdalen's mother, Lady Margaret, married James Johnstone, 1st Earl of Hartfell, thereafter becoming the Countess of Hartfell. Her sister, Margaret Carnegie, married Gavin Dalzell, 2nd Earl of Carnwath. Together, they were the parents of:

- Ann Crawfurd (c. 1640–c. 1675), who married Sir Archibald Stewart, 1st Baronet, of Blackhall, a son of John Stewart of Blackhall and Ardgowan, and Mary Stirling (a daughter of Sir James Stirling of Keir).
- Margaret Crawfurd (c. 1651–1680), who married Hon. Patrick Lindsay, son of John Lindsay, 17th Earl of Crawford and Lady Margaret Hamilton (a daughter of the 2nd Marquess of Hamilton).

Sir John died in 1661. On his death, as he had no male issue, the baronetcy became dormant. The representation of the family passed to Cornelius Craufurd of Jordanhill, as heir-male; while his estate, including Kilbirnie Castle, was settled on his youngest daughter, Margaret, according to his last will was dated 31 July 1662. His baronetcy remained dormant for over 100 hundred years, before being assumed in 1765 by a distant cousin, Sir Hew Crawfurd of Jordanhill.

=== Descendants ===
Through his daughter Margaret, he was a grandfather of John Crawford (great-grandfather of the 20th Earl of Crawford), Margaret Crawford (wife of David Boyle, 1st Earl of Glasgow) and Magdalen Crawford (who married George Dundas of Duddingstoun, and was great-grandmother of Gabriel Hamilton Dundas).

Baronetage of Nova Scotia
New creation	Baronet (of Kilbirnie); 1628–1662	Succeeded by Hew Crawfurd (dormant until 1765)
