= Renfrewshire (Parliament of Scotland constituency) =

Before the Acts of Union 1707, the barons of the shire of Renfrew elected commissioners to represent them in the unicameral Parliament of Scotland and in the Convention of the Estates. The number of commissioners was increased from two to three in 1690.

From 1708 Renfrewshire was represented by one Member of Parliament in the House of Commons of Great Britain.

== List of shire commissioners ==
- 1593: Sir Patrick Houston of that Ilk
- 1593: Sir John Maxwell of Pollok
- 1612: names unknown
- 1617: Sir John Maxwell, 1st Baronet, of Pollok
- 1617: Sir Archibald Stewart of Castlemilk
- 1621: William Semple of Fulwood
- 1633: Patrick Fleming of Barrochan
- 1633, 1661–62: Sir Archibald Stewart of Blackhall
- 1639–41: Sir Patrick Maxwell of Newark
- 1639–41, 1645–47: Sir Ludovic Houston of that Ilk
- 1643: William Cunningham of Craigends
- 1643–44, 1644, 1649, 1667: John Shaw of Greenock
- 1644–45, 1650: John Brisbane of Bishopton
- 1645: Sir John Hamilton of Orbiston
- 1645–47: Sir James Muir of Caldwell
- 1648: Alexander Porterfield of that Ilk
- 1649–50: Sir George Maxwell of Pollok
- 1661: Patrick Houston, fiar of that Ilk
- 1667: Sir Archibald Stewart of Blackhall
- 1669–70: Sir Archibald Stewart of Castlemilk
- 1669–74, 1678, 1681–82: Sir John Shaw of Greenock
- 1681–82, 1685–86: William Hamilton of Orbistoun
- 1685–86, 1702–07: John Houston, younger of that Ilk (Sir John from 1696)
- 1689–93, 1695–96, 1698–99: Sir John Maxwell of Pollok (appointed Lord Justice Clerk, 1699)
- 1689–95: William Coningham of Craigends (expelled)
- 1690–98: John Caldwell of that Ilk (died c.1700)
- 1700-02: Alexander Porterfield of that Ilk
- 1700–01, 1702–04: John Stewart, younger of Blackhall
- 1700–02, 1702–07: Sir Robert Pollok of that Ilk

== See also ==
- List of constituencies in the Parliament of Scotland at the time of the Union
