= Patrick Boyle, Lord Shewalton =

Scottish Judge in 18th century

Patrick Boyle, Lord Shewalton (1690–1761) was a Scottish judge who served as a Senator of the College of Justice.

== Life ==
He was born in 1690 the second son of David Boyle, 1st Earl of Glasgow and his wife Margaret Lindsay Crawford sister of John Crawford, Viscount Garnock. David Boyle was also known as Lord Boyle of Kelburn and was Treasurer-Depute to Queen Anne and a member of the Privy Council. Patrick's elder brother was John Boyle, 2nd Earl of Glasgow.

His father was one of the commissioners organising the Treaty of Union 1707 and was High Commissioner to the General Assembly of the Church of Scotland from 1706 to 1710.

In 1715 his uncle William Boyle bought the Shewalton House and estate on the Ayrshire coast, and on his death Patrick inherited the estate.

In 1746 he replaced James Elphinstone, Lord Balmerino as a Senator of the College of Justice choosing the name Lord Shewalton

He died in 1761 and was replaced by James Erskine, Lord Alva.

== Family ==
He was unmarried. The Shewalton estate passed to his nephew Rev Patrick Boyle and thence to Patrick's son, David Boyle, Lord Boyle who became Solicitor General for Scotland.
