= John Boyle, 2nd Earl of Glasgow =

Scottish nobleman (1688–1740)

John Boyle, 2nd Earl of Glasgow (April 1688 – 22 May 1740) was a Scottish nobleman.

== Origins ==
Boyle was the eldest son and heir of David Boyle, 1st Earl of Glasgow, by Margaret, daughter of the Hon. Patrick Lindsay (second son of John Lindsay, 17th Earl of Crawford). The Boyles were an ancient family, whose estates centred on Kelburn in North Ayrshire.

== Career ==
Boyle was born in April 1688 and succeeded to the peerage on 31 October 1733. By disposition dated 31 March 1721 he acquired the lands of Ballikewin in the island of Cumbrae from his kinsman, James Boyle.

He died at Kelburn on 22 May 1740 and was buried at Largs Church on 29 May 1740.

== Family ==
In 1707, Boyle married Helenor, third daughter of William Morrison of Prestongrange, in the county of county Haddington. She died at Edinburgh on 7 July 1767. Their children included:

- David Boyle (d. 1710)
- William Boyle (1713–1715)
- John Boyle (1714–1775), who succeeded his father as the 3rd Earl of Glasgow.
- Charles Boyle (b. 1715), who died young
- Patrick Boyle of Shewalton (1717–1798), who married first Agnes Mure, daughter of William Mure of Caldwell, and secondly Elizabeth Dunlop, daughter of Alexander Dunlop, a professor of Greek at the University of Glasgow. They were the parents of David Boyle, Lord Boyle.
- David Boyle (b. 1717), who died young
- Janet Boyle (1711–1770)
- Margaret Boyle (1712–1772)
- Jean Boyle (d. 1756)
- Helen Boyle (d. 1794), who married Sir James Douglas, 1st Baronet
- Marion Boyle (d. 1757)
- Catharine Boyle, who married Dr. James MacNeill of Neilhall on 10 December 1770.

Peerage of Scotland
Preceded by David Boyle	Earl of Glasgow; 1733–1740	Succeeded by John Boyle
