= James Stuart, 2nd Earl of Bute =

Scottish noble (before 1696–1723)

The Right Honourable The Earl of Bute
- Born: James Stuart; Before 1696
- Died: 28 January 1723
- Title: Earl of Bute
- Spouse: Lady Anne Campbell (m. 1711)
- Children: John Stuart, 3rd Earl of Bute; The Hon. James Stuart-Mackenzie; The Hon. Archibald Stuart; Lady Mary Menzies; Lady Elizabeth Stuart; Anne, Lady Ruthven; Lady Jean Stuart; Lady Grace Stuart
- Parent(s): James Stuart, 1st Earl of Bute; Agnes Mackenzie

James Stuart, 2nd Earl of Bute (before 1696 – 28 January 1723) was the son of James Stuart, 1st Earl of Bute and Agnes Mackenzie.

== Family ==
In February 1711, he married Lady Anne Campbell (daughter of Archibald Campbell, 1st Duke of Argyll and Elizabeth Tollemache) and had eight children:

- John Stuart, 3rd Earl of Bute (25 May 1713 – 10 March 1792)
- James Stuart-Mackenzie (b. before 1723 – c. April 1800)
- Hon. Archibald Stuart
- Lady Mary Stuart (b. c1713, d. 30 December 1773) married 31 October 1729 to Sir Robert Menzies of Weem (b. c1706, d. 1786)
- Lady Elizabeth Stuart
- Lady Anne Stuart (b. before 1723 – 28 November 1786), married July 1736 James Johnstone (later Ruthven, 5th Lord Ruthven of Freeland)
- Lady Jean Stuart
- Lady Grace Stuart

On his death his wife remarried to Alexander Fraser, Lord Strichen.

Peerage of Scotland
Preceded by James Stuart	Earl of Bute; 1710–1723	Succeeded by John Stuart
