= Sir Hew Crawfurd, 2nd Baronet =

Sir Hew Crawfurd, 2nd Baronet (1718 – 2 July 1794) was a Scottish baronet.

== Early life ==
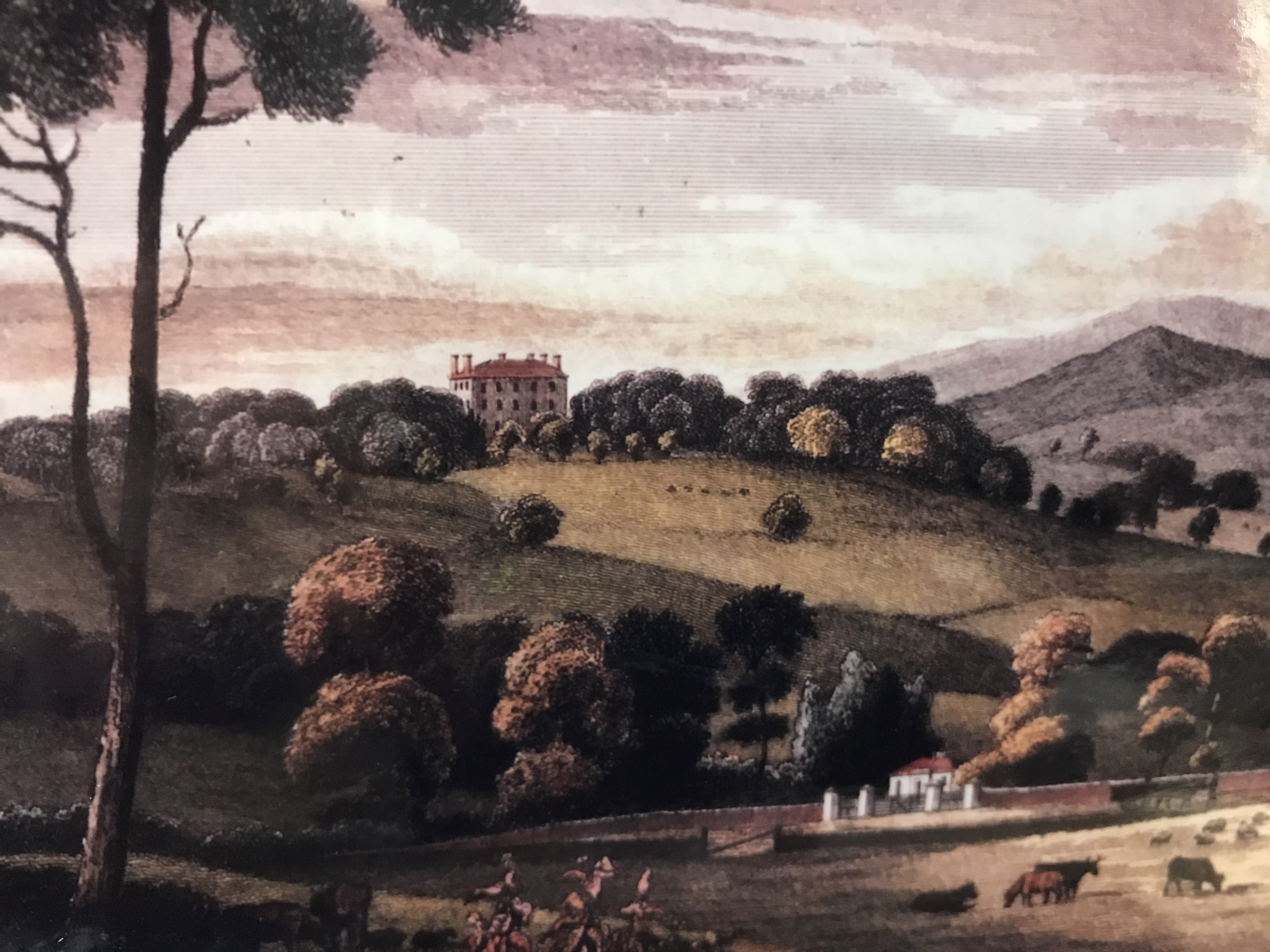
Early nineteenth century print of Jordanhill House

Crawfurd was born in 1718. He was the son of Hew Crawfurd of Jordanhill (c. 1690–1756) and Mary Greenshields. Among his siblings were sisters Elizabeth Crawfurd (wife of George Gordon, Esq. of Abergeldie), and Margaret Crawfurd (wife of Samuel Forbes of Knapperny, cousin of Sir Alexander Forbes, 2nd Baronet of Foveran).

His paternal grandparents were James Crawfurd (a son of Hugh Crawford of Jordanhill and Bethia Hamilton), the Sheriff Depute of Renfrewshire, and Isobella Crawfurd (a daughter of William Crawfurd of Baidland). His maternal grandparents were the Rev. James Greenshields of Finnough and Elizabeth (née Paterson) Greenshields.

== Career ==
In 1756, he served as heir to his father's estate. On 19 July 1765, he was served heir male of Sir John Crawfurd, of Kilbirnie by the Sheriff of Edinburgh. As a mark of Royal favour, on 11 September 1765, he "received a grant, by warrant under the sign-manual, of supporters, in addition to the coat of arms given out to Sir John as a Baronet of Nova Scotia, by the Lord Lyon, and matriculated in his register in accordance with the provisions of the 21st act of the 3rd session of the 2nd parliament of Charles II."

In 1771, he was named heir of the estate of Col. Crawfud of Craufurdland, however, while on his deathbed in February 1793, Col. Crawfurd "executed a gratuitous disposition of the same lands in favour of Thomas Coutts." The heirs fought the change but it was upheld by the Court of Session.

== Personal life ==
In 1753 Crawfurd married Robina Pollok of Pollok (1737–1820), only child of Capt. John Pollok of Balgray, who was killed at the Battle of Fontenoy in 1745, and Ann Lockhart (a daughter of James Lockhart of Lee). Her father was the only brother of Sir Robert Pollock, 1st Baronet. Her grandparents were Robert Pollock, of Pollok, and his second wife, Jean Craufurd (a daughter of Cornelius Craufurd of Jordanhill). In 1807, Robina became heir to Pollock Castle. Together, they were the parents of two sons and three daughters, including:

- Margaret Craufurd (1761–1841), who married Fletcher. After his death, she married John Hamilton of Bardowie, elder brother of Francis Buchanan-Hamilton, in 1795. (Note: John Hamilton (1758–1818) was the second son of Elizabeth (née Hamilton) and Thomas Buchanan of Spittal and Leny. Upon his inheritance of Bardowie from his maternal grandfather, John Hamilton of Bardowie, he changed his surname from Buchanan to Hamilton. As Margaret and John died without issue, Bardowie passed to John's youngest brother, Francis Buchanan, who added to his surname, becoming Francis Buchanan-Hamilton.)
- Sir Robert Craufurd-Pollok, 3rd Baronet (1762–1845), who took on the surname Pollok upon the death of his mother in 1820, to comply with the terms of her estate; he married Mary Mushet, daughter of Dr. William Mushet, in 1793.
- Robina Lockhart Crawfurd (1765–1837), who died unmarried.
- Lucken "Lucy" Craufurd (1767–1850), who married Gen. John Gordon-Cuming-Skene, 11th of Pitlurg, son of John Gordon-Cuming, 10th of Pitlurg, in 1782.
- Hew Crawfurd (1769–1831), who married Jane Johnstone, a daughter of William Johnstone, of Headfort, near Drumsna, County Leitrim.
- Elizabeth Crawfurd (b. 1771)

Sir Hew died on 2 July 1794 at Sloane Street in Kensington, London. He was succeeded in the baronetcy by his eldest son, Robert. His widow, Lady Crawfurd, had her name legally changed to Robina Pollok in 1807 after inheriting the Pollok estates from Jean Pollok. She died in 1820.

=== Descendants ===
Through his son Hew, he was a grandfather of Capt. Sir Hew Crawfurd-Pollok, 4th Baronet (1794–1867), who married Elizabeth Oswald, parents of Sir Hew Crawfurd-Pollok, 5th Baronet.

== Notes ==
Baronetage of Nova Scotia
Preceded by John Crawfurd (dormant since 1765)	Baronet (of Kilbirnie); 1765–1794	Succeeded by Robert Crawfurd-Pollok
