= Sir John Cunningham, 1st Baronet =

Sir John Cunningham, 1st Baronet, of Lambroughton (died November 1684), was a member of the Convention of the Estates of Scotland and of the Parliament of Scotland.

== Biography ==
Cunningham was the son and heir of John Cunningham, of Brownhill in Tarbolton and Geiss in Caithness, a member of the Committee of War, and his second wife Elizabeth, daughter of Sir John Sinclair of Ratter. He was admitted an advocate and became a lawyer of some distinction. He purchased the estate of Lambroughton soon after 1663, sold the estate of Brownhill in 1667, and in 1683 purchased the old family estate of Caprington in the parish of Riccarton, Ayrshire. He was shire commissioner for Ayrshire in 1665 and again from 1681 to 1682, and on 19 or 21 September 1669 was created a Baronet of Nova Scotia. He married Margaret, daughter of John Murray of Touch Adam and Polmaise; their son Sir William Cunningham, 2nd Baronet was baptized on 7 February 1664. Cunningham was buried on 20 November 1684.
