= Crisis at the Castle =

British television documentary series

Crisis at the Castle is a three-part documentary series that aired on BBC Four and American public broadcasting stations in 2007. The series chronicled the financial troubles at three British castles: Kelburn Castle, Ayrshire; Burton Court, Herefordshire; and Sudeley Castle, Gloucestershire.

The episode on Sudeley Castle, the former residence of Catherine Parr, examines the friction between Elizabeth, Lady Ashcombe, and her two children, caused by the struggle to generate sufficient income to maintain it as a family home.
