= Mure baronets =

Nova Scotia Peerage

The Mure Baronetcy, of Rowallan was a baronetcy created on 4 May 1662 in the Baronetage of Nova Scotia for Patrick Mure, a younger son of Sir William Mure. The title became extinct upon the death of the first baronet in 1700.

== Mure baronets, of Rowallan (1662) ==
- Sir Patrick Mure, 1st Baronet (1622–1700)
