= John Boyle, 3rd Earl of Glasgow =

Scottish nobleman

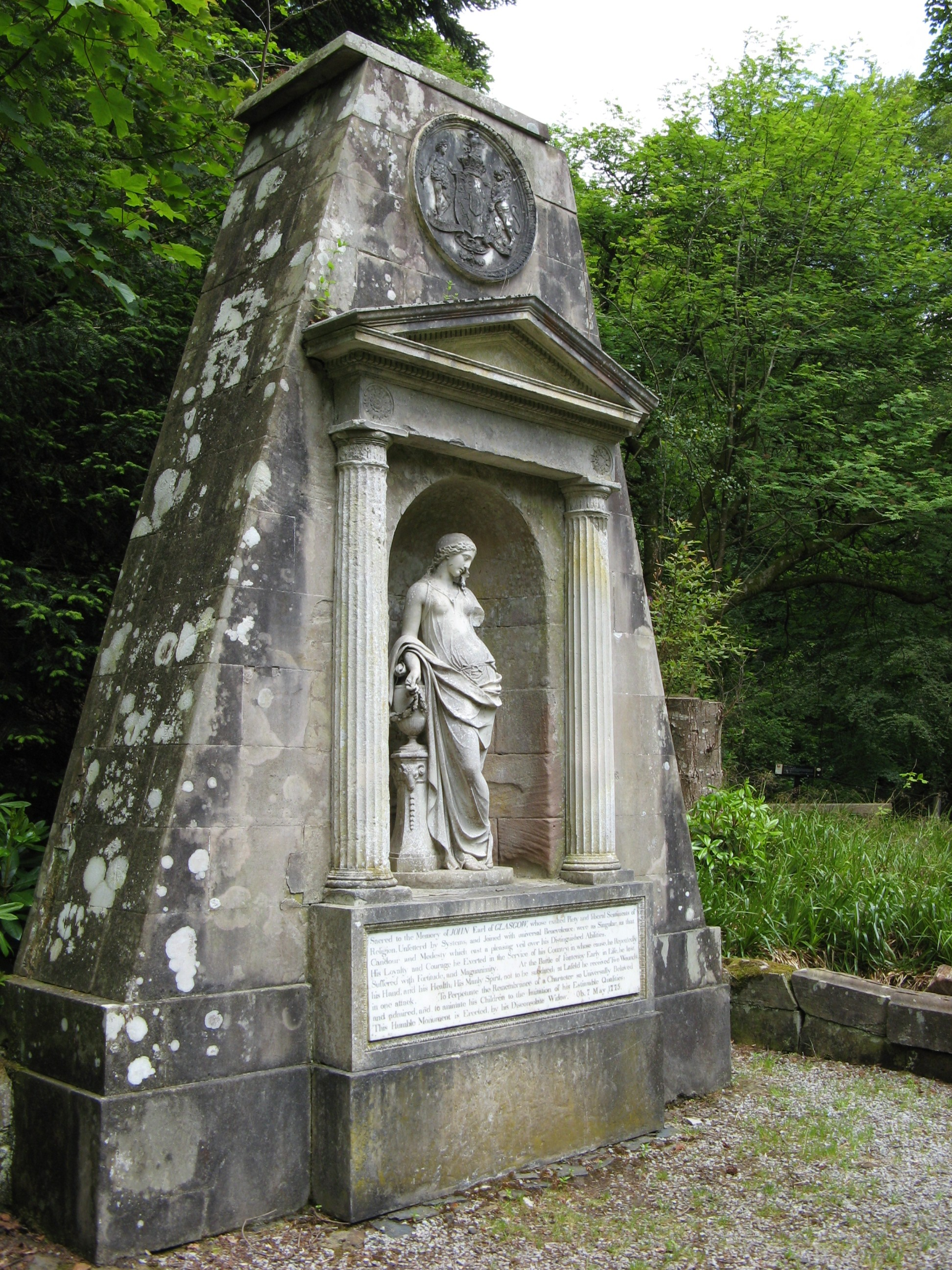
Monument to the 3rd Earl of Glasgow in the gardens of Kelburn Castle

John Boyle, 3rd Earl of Glasgow (4 November 1714 – 7 March 1775) was a Scottish nobleman.

== Origins ==
Boyle was the third but eldest surviving son and heir of John Boyle, 2nd Earl of Glasgow, by Helenor Morrison, third daughter of William Morrison of Prestongrange, county Haddington. The Boyle family's estates were centred on Kelburn in North Ayrshire.

== Career ==
Lord Glasgow was a captain in the 33rd Regiment of Foot, and took part in the Battle of Fontenoy on 30 April 1745 and the Battle of Lauffeld on 2 July 1747, being wounded on both occasions. Between 1755 and 1757, he was Lord Rector of the University of Glasgow and between 1764 and 1772, he was Lord High Commissioner to the General Assembly of the Church of Scotland.

He died on 7 March 1775 at Kelburn.

== Family ==
By his marriage (7 July 1755) to Elizabeth Ross, daughter of George Ross, 13th Lord Ross, Lord Ross's ancestral estates of Halkhead were ultimately brought into his family. She survived him, dying of apoplexy in London on 9 October 1791. Their children included:

- John Boyle (born 26 March 1756), who died in infancy
- George Boyle, 4th Earl of Glasgow

Peerage of Scotland
Preceded by John Boyle	Earl of Glasgow; 1740–1775	Succeeded by George Boyle
