= William Mure (writer) =

Scottish writer and politician

Sir William Mure of Rowallan

Member of the Parliament of Scotland for Ayrshire
- In office 22 June 1643 – 3 June 1644
- Preceded by: Henry Montgomerie
- Succeeded by: Sir John Crawford of Kilbirnie

Personal details
- Born: 1594
- Died: 1657 (aged 62–63)
- Spouse(s): Anna Dundas (m. 1615; died 1644) Jane Hamilton, Lady Duntreath
- Children: 15
- Parent(s): Sir William Mure; Elizabeth Montgomerie
- Relatives: Alexander Montgomerie (uncle)

Sir William Mure of Rowallan (1594–1657) was a Scottish writer and politician.

== Early life ==
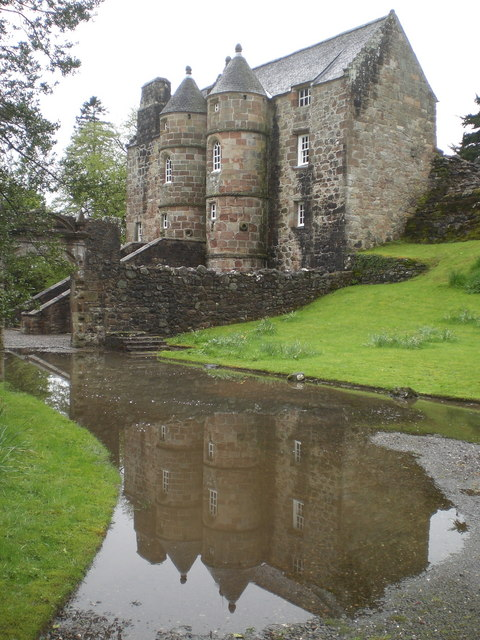
Rowallan Castle, Sir William Mure's ancestral home in Ayrshire, Scotland.

William Mure was born in 1594 at Rowallan, an estate near Kilmarnock in Ayrshire. His father was Sir William Mure of Rowallan (1576–1639). His mother was Elizabeth Montgomerie, daughter of Hugh Montgomerie (d. 1558), the Laird of Hessilhead, and sister of the poet Alexander Montgomerie of Hessilhead Castle near Beith.

His grandfather, also Sir William Mure of Rowallan (1547–1616), had three daughters and three sons, William Mure of Rowallan, John Mure of Blacklaw, who was slain at Beith, and Hugh Mure of Skirnalland, of which his father, Sir William Mure of Rowallan, was the eldest. The Mure family was one of the oldest of the order of gentry in Scotland, and his ancestor, Elizabeth Mure, was the first wife of King Robert II of Scotland (1316–1390), and the father of King Robert III.

== Career ==
Mure's early, unpublished works appear to date from 1611 to 1617, and include love-lyrics (the tunes to which they are to be sung are specified in several cases), eleven miscellaneous sonnets, a ‘Hymne’ beginning 'Help, help, O Lord! sueit saviour aryse', in a complex verse form presumably reflecting an existing song melody, and Dido and Aeneas, a paraphrase of Aeneid IV, probably written in 1614. In 1617, Mure composed 114 lines welcoming King James VI and I to Hamilton on 28 July, and this piece was published the following year as part of the large commemorative volume The Muses Welcome, edited by John Adamson.

=== Political career ===
In 1639, upon his father's death, Mure inherited his father's title, Laird of Rowallan, and thereafter lived in Rowallan Castle. Mure was a member of the Scottish parliament in 1643, and took part in the English campaign of 1644. He was wounded at the Battle of Marston Moor, but a month later was commanding a regiment at Newcastle.

=== Later works ===
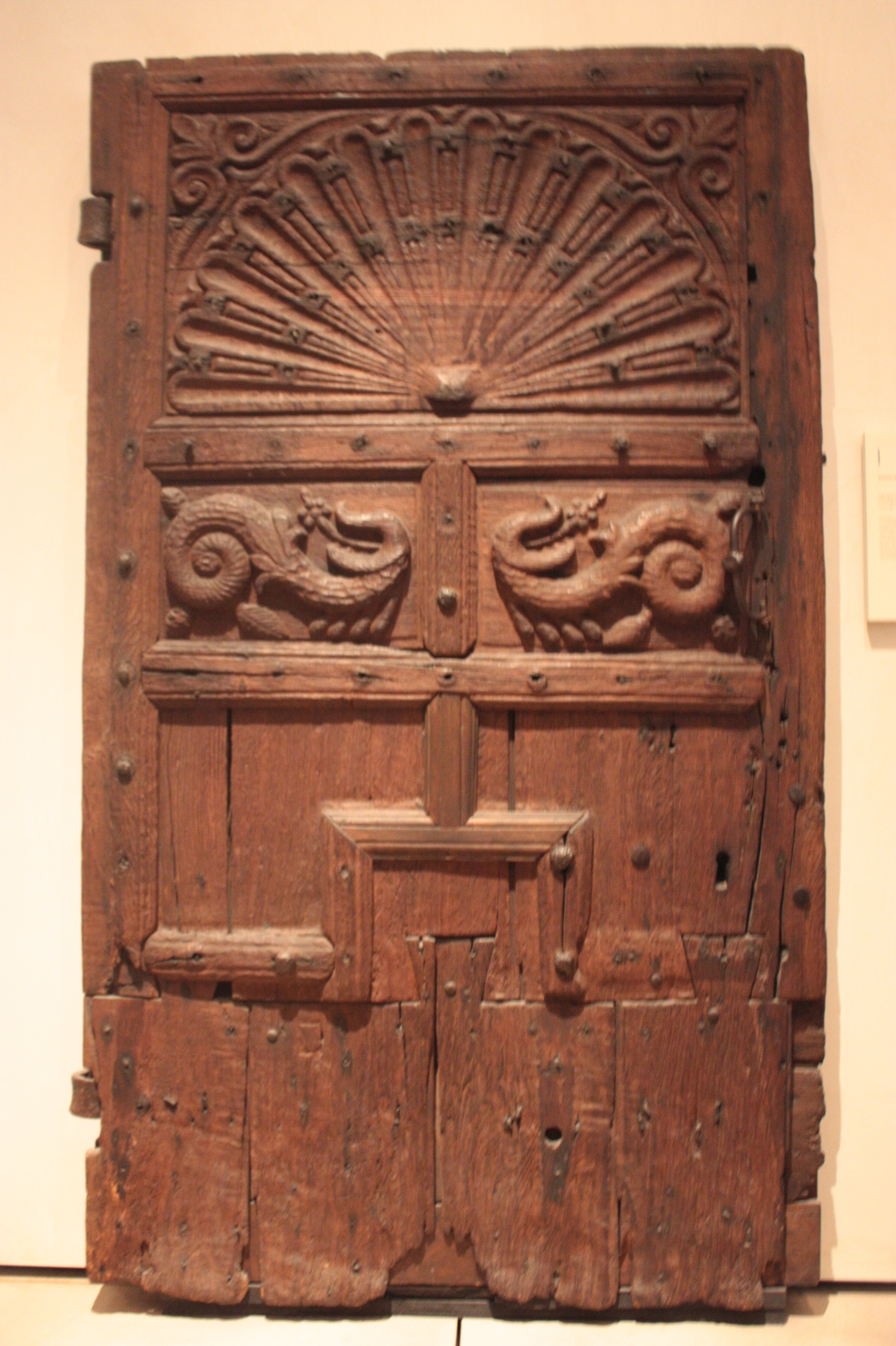
16th-century oak door from Rowallan Castle, National Museum of Scotland.

The rest of Mure's poetic output is quite different in nature, and expresses his deep commitment to Calvinism and, latterly, to the presbyterian model of kirk government. It has been suggested that the shift in Mure's poetic focus may have been prompted by his reading of Francis Hamilton's King James His Encomium (Edinburgh, 1626). Mure could equally well have been influenced by his local minister, the strongly presbyterian Glasgow graduate and neo-Latin poet Michael Wallace, who had become minister of Kilmarnock in 1610. His Carmen Panegryricum welcoming James VI and I to Paisley on 24 July 1617 visit was, like Mure's welcome to Hamilton, included in The Muses Welcome of 1618, and there is no question that Wallace and Mure were well acquainted.

In 1628, at Edinburgh, Mure published A Spirituall Hymne or The Sacrifice of a Sinner to be offred upon the Altar of a humbled heart Christ our Redeemer. Inverted in English Sapphicks from the Latine, i.e. translation of the Ayrshire theologian Robert Boyd of Trochrig's Hecatombe Christiana...ad Christum Servatorem: the terminally ill Boyd had published the Hecatombe the previous year, with a dedication to his cousin Bishop Andrew Boyd. Mure followed his paraphrase of Robert Boyd with his own lengthy meditation on the Last Judgement, entitled ‘Doomes-Day containing Hells horrour and Heavens happinesse’, to which he appended the three sonnets entitled ‘Fancies Farewell’. In these last, Mure repented of his Muse's ‘Houres mis-employed, evanisht as a dreame’ and ‘younger yeares, youthes sweet Aprile mispent’. In 1629, Mure published the 3236 lines of The True Crucifixe for True Catholikes, a sustained denunciation of Roman Catholicism. The preliminary paratext consists of a sonnet by Drummond of Hawthornden, Latin verses by John Adamson, John Gellie and Michael Wallace, and ten vernacular couplets by Walter Forbes. Mure appended a postliminary sequence of ten spiritual sonnets, possibly inspired by the example of James Melville, who concluded A Spirituall Propine of a Pastour to His People (1598) with a series of ten sonnets. Mure's final sonnet, ‘To the Blessed Trinity’, is an echo of the first sonnet in Melville's sequence, namely ‘Svpreame, essence, beginner, vnbegon’; but the latter itself stands in an ambiguous relationship to the sonnet ‘Supreme Essence, beginning Vnbegun’ by Mure's uncle Alexander Montgomerie.

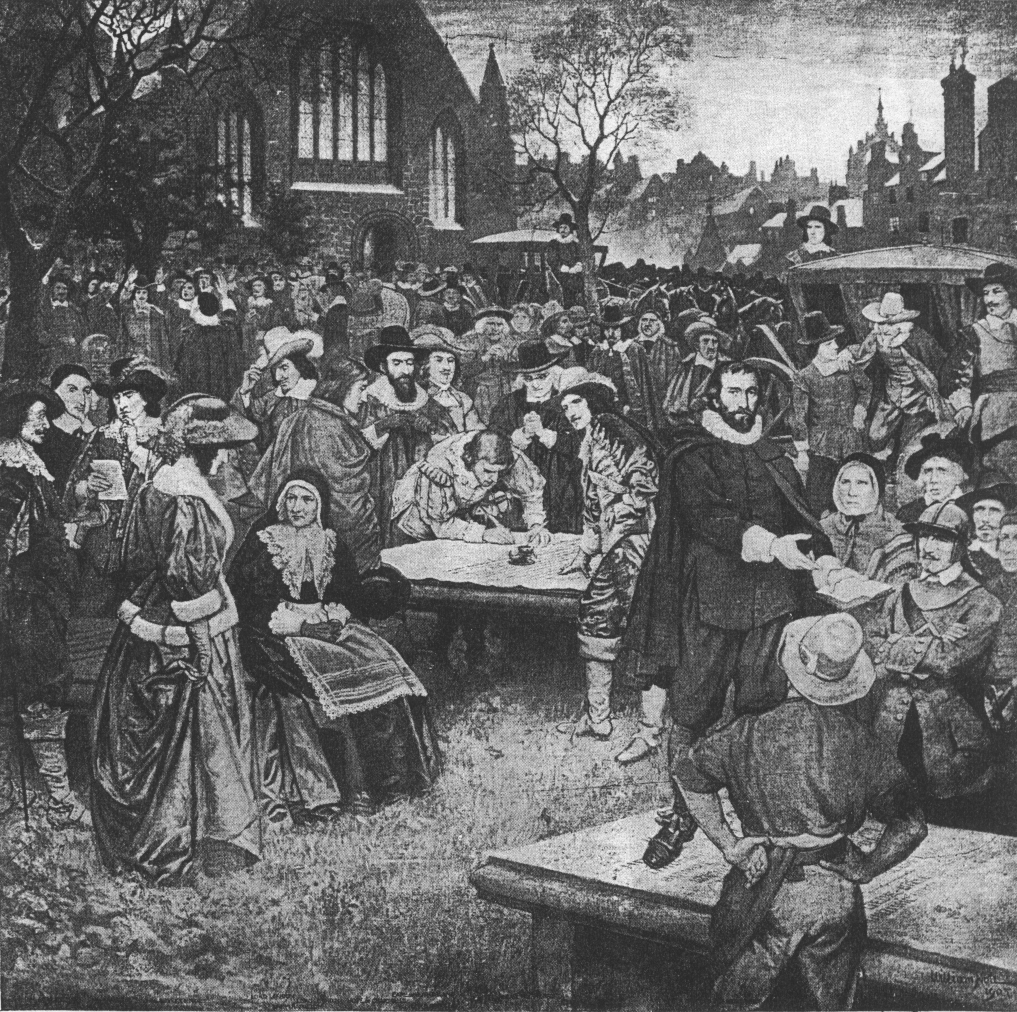
The Signing of The National Covenant in Greyfriars Kirkyard, Edinburgh 1638, a painting by William Hole.

The influence of James Melville's The Black Bastel, or A Lamentation in name of the Kirk of Scotland (written 1611, published in 1634) is unmistakable in Mure's vehemently anti-episcopalian and anti-Laudian sonnet sequence The Joy of Teares, published in 1635: the numerous verbal and conceptual links between The Joy of Tears and The Black Bastel leap off the page. They range from references to Eli and the ‘captive ark’ and the ‘hungry souls’ fed by the incomparable pre-episcopal Kirk, to mentions of ‘dogs and swine’, ‘poperie’ and the mourning faithful. Melville's image of the enslavement of the defiled Kirk by James VI and I and his bishops - ‘‘upon a royall Throne, / Did awful sit … a rampand Lyon red … And round about him thirteen wolues did dance/ To keep her sheep’ - underlies Mure's ‘woolfs that lams do chase’ in line 5 of his twelfth sonnet. By 1635, tensions had already risen very high between Charles I's authoritarian, episcopal ‘Court of High Commission’ and the presbyterian opposition. Mure did not dare to name himself as author of The Joy of Teares. Instead, he stated on the title page that the book was ‘published with the gratious licence and privilege of GOD Almighty, King of Heaven and Earth the penult day of Iuly, Anno Dom.1635’, and in a couplet following his opening sonnet to the reader, Mure wrote ‘No marvel I my name forbear/ Since blameless Truth dar scarce appear’.

Following the signing of the National Covenant in spring 1638 and the outbreak of hostilities between the Scottish Covenanting régime and King Charles, Mure wrote in support of the Covenant. In 1640, he published A Counter-buff to Lysimachus Nicanor; calling himself a Jesuit, a verse-denunciation of anti-Covenanting propaganda, as are the 102 couplets of the undated (?1641) Caledons Complaint against infamous Libells. Or a censure past upon the Truth-betraying Sycophant, dareing (most ignobly) to streck at the honour of this deeply afflicted Nation upon pretence of the guilt of rebellion, in justice to be represt by the power of his Majesties armes. The poet's last publication was The Cry of Blood and of a Broken Covenant (1650) in 316 couplets. Mure also left a verse paraphrase of the Psalms, now incomplete and possibly never fully completed, and the unfinished prose Historie and Descent of the House of Rowallane.

All of the foregoing works – barring The Joy of Teares – were edited by William Tough for the Scottish Text Society (2 vols., 1898). The Joy of Teares was published in the Scottish Text Society Miscellany volume of 1933, pp. 161–78.

Mure was also a music-lover, and his lute-book and ‘cantus’ partbook are preserved in Edinburgh University Library (La.III.487 and 488 respectively). The complete contents of the former can be heard online.

== Personal life ==
Mure was married twice. His first marriage was in 1615, to Anna Dundas (1598–1644), the daughter of John Dundas, Laird of Newliston, and Margaret Dundas (née Creichton). Before her death in 1644, they had five sons and six daughters, of which only one daughter reached maturity, including:

- Sir William Mure of Rowallan (1616–1686), who married Elizabeth Hamilton, daughter of James Hamilton of Aikenhead, Provost of Glasgow.
- Captain Alexander Mure (1618–1648), who arrived in Ulster in May 1642 with Covenanter army and was killed in the Irish Confederate War in 1648
- Robert Mure, a major in the army who married Anne Maxwell, Lady Newhall, widow of James McMorran of Newhall, in Fife
- John Mure of Fenwickhill
- Sir Patrick Mure, 1st Baronet (1622–1700), who was created baronet of Rowallan in 1662
- Joan Mure, who married Uchter Knox, Laird of Ranfurly, whose family later became the Earls of Ranfurly. Knox's sister, Isobell, married Robert Muir of Caldwell

After his first wife's death, he married Jane Hamilton, Lady Duntreath (d. 1665), daughter of Archibald Hamilton, of Duntreath. Together they had two sons and two daughters, James Mure, Hugh Mure, Jane Mure, and Marion Mure.

=== Descendants ===
Mure's eldest son, William Mure (1616–1686), who succeeded him, was firmly attached to the Reformed doctrines, and was a close friend of William Guthrie (1620–1665), the first minister of Fenwick. He was imprisoned in 1665 in Stirling Castle, along with the Lairds of Cunningham and Nether-Pollock, who weren't released until 1669. In 1683, he was again apprehended under suspicion of the court, this time with his elder son, William Mure (d. 1700), and they were held as prisoners in Tolbooth in Edinburgh. His second son, John Mure, was also taken prisoner in 1683, and all were discharged in April 1684, upon giving a bond of £2,000

Mure's grandson, William Mure of Rowallan (d. 1700), was a student at the University of Glasgow in 1660. Apart from his imprisonment alongside his father, he was a member of the Scottish Parliament and was married to Dame Mary Scott, heiress of Collarny in Fife. They had three daughters, of which only one, Jean Mure (d. 1724), his only heir, survived to adulthood. Jean married twice, first to William Fairlie of Bruntsfield, near Edinburgh, with whom she had children. After his death, she married David Boyle, 1st Earl of Glasgow (c. 1666–1733), with whom she had three daughters. After the death of Jean Mure, Countess of Glasgow, in 1724, she was succeeded by her elder surviving daughter, Lady Jean Boyle Mure of Rowallan, who married the Hon. Sir James Campbell (c. 1680–1745) in 1720. Sir James Campbell was the third and youngest son of James Campbell, 2nd Earl of Loudoun. Their son, James Mure Campbell (1726–1786), succeeded to the estate of Rowallan, and later became the 5th Earl of Loudoun. James married Flora Macleod, daughter of John Macleod of Raasay, with whom he had Flora Mure-Campbell (1780–1840), his heir and the 6th Countess of Loudoun. She married Francis Rawdon-Hastings, 1st Marquess of Hastings (1754–1826), in 1804.

His granddaughter, Helen Knox, was married to John Cunningham of Ceddell. As Mure's daughter and son-in-law, Uchter Knox, had no male issue, the Ranfurly estate was sold to Lord Cochrane, who became William Cochrane, 1st Earl of Dundonald, in 1665.
