= Montgomery-Cuninghame baronets =

Hereditary title

The baronetcy of Cuninghame of Corsehill was created in the Baronetage of Nova Scotia and conferred upon Alexander Cuninghame of Corsehill, a Scottish baron and landowner in Dumfriesshire and a great-great-great-grandson of the 4th Earl of Glencairn. The fourth baronet's father added the name Montgomery before his own on inheriting the estate of Kirktonholm.

== Cuninghame, later Montgomery-Cuninghame of Corsehill baronets, of Corsehill (1672) ==
- Sir Alexander Cuninghame, 1st Baronet (c. 1643–1685) was the son of Alexander Cuningham and Anne Crawford. He married Mary Stewart.
- Sir Alexander Cuninghame, 2nd Baronet (died 1730) married Margaret Boyle and had a daughter, Jean, and a son David.
- Sir David Cuninghame, 3rd Baronet (died 1770) married Penelope Montgomery by whom he had three sons and a daughter, the eldest of whom, Alexander, who married Elizabeth Montgomery, was father of the 4th, 5th and 6th Baronets.
- Sir Walter Montgomery-Cuninghame, 4th Baronet (died 1814), who, in 1790, styling himself to be "Walter Lord Lyle" was not permitted to vote in the election of peers nor was he granted leave to petition for Privileges Committee for recognition as such. He along with Lady Harriet Don opposed the claim to the Earldom of Glencairn of Sir Adam Fergusson of Kilkerran in 1797 despite having failed to provide evidence of his being an heir-male of an unspecified Earl of Glencairn.
- Sir David Montgomery-Cuninghame, 5th Baronet (died 1814)
- Sir James Montgomery-Cuninghame, 6th Baronet (died 1837) married Janet Cumming by whom he had five sons and two daughters.
- Sir Alexander David Montgomery-Cuninghame, 7th Baronet, died unmarried in 1846. He was succeeded by his brother, Thomas.
- Sir Thomas Montgomery-Cuninghame, 8th Baronet (c. 1808–1870). Montgomery-Cuninghame unsuccessfully claimed the title of Earl of Glencairn as the lineal male descendant of Andrew Cunningham, second son of William Cunningham, 4th Earl of Glencairn. He was a Lieutenant-Colonel in the Ayrshire Rifles. He married in 1832, Charlotte, only child of Hugh Hutcheson, Esq., by whom he had 3 sons and 4 daughters of whom, Jessie, Eleanor and William James survived infancy.
- Sir William Montgomery-Cuninghame, 9th Baronet (1834–1897) was educated at Harrow School and fought in the Crimean War with the Rifle Brigade, where he won the Victoria Cross. He was Member of Parliament for Ayr Burghs from 1874–80. He married Elizabeth Hartopp in 1869 and had by her two sons and seven daughters. Elizabeth died in 1936 and both are buried at Kirkmichael in South Ayrshire.
- Sir Thomas Andrew Alexander Montgomery-Cuninghame of Corsehill, 10th Baronet (1877–1945) was educated at Eton College and the Royal Military College, Sandhurst, and served in the Second Boer War with The Rifle Brigade with distinction, for which he received the Distinguished Service Order. He rose to the rank of Colonel and was the British Military Representative to Austria (1919–20) and British Military Attaché in Vienna (1920–23). He married firstly Alice Frances Denison Des Voeux in 1904 and by her had one son, Alexander (died 1944) and a daughter, Pamela; he married secondly, Nancy Macaulay Foggo, by whom he had two sons, Andrew, 11th Baronet, and John, 12th Baronet.
- Sir (William) Andrew Malcolm Martin Oliphant Montgomery-Cuninghame of Corsehill, 11th Baronet (1929–1959) was the elder son of the 10th baronet by his second wife, Nancy Macaulay Foggo. He was educated at Fettes College, Edinburgh and Worcester College, Oxford and following family tradition served for his National Service in The Rifle Brigade. After university he entered the British Foreign Office. He married Sarah Carolyn Gordon-Lennox, only daughter of Brigadier-General Lord Esmé Gordon-Lennox KCVO, in 1956, but died without issue 3 years later.
- Sir John Christopher Foggo Montgomery Cuninghame of Corsehill, 12th Baronet of Corsehill (born 24 July 1935). Montgomery Cuninghame (following a ruling by Lord Lyon in 1996 he de-hyphenated the surname in order not to be denied recognition as family head) is a British businessman. He is the second son of Sir Thomas Montgomery-Cuninghame, 10th Baronet, and his second wife, Nancy née Foggo. He was educated at Fettes College and Worcester College, Oxford. Before university he was commissioned as a National Service officer into The Rifle Brigade. On 9 September 1964, he married Laura Nicholson, the second daughter of Sir Godfrey Nicholson, Bt. and they have three daughters: Christian Elizabeth (born 1967); Georgiana Rose "Nina" (born 1969), married ITV's journalist, Rageh Omaar; Elizabeth Clara (born 1971), married to Ben Brabyn. Sir John Cuninghame has had wide experience as an investment banker and venture capitalist both in North America and in Europe.

Sir John claims the title of Earl of Glencairn although he has never officially petitioned the House of Lords. His ancestors did not petition for the title in the House of Lords in 1797 as they had not provided sufficient evidence of being heirs-male to the Earls of Glencairn and again were denied in the 19th century due to a lack of propinquity. The estates and lordships were passed by strict entail of the 12th Earl of Glencairn to the "heirs male of her own body" of his eldest daughter, Lady Margaret Cunningham, wife of Nicol Graham of Gartmore and to their line should his male heir line fail, which it did upon the death of the 15th Earl of Glencairn in 1796.

Sir John petitioned the Lord Lyon, King of Arms, for recognition as Chief of the Name and Arms of Cunningham in March 2010 and was recognised as such by the Lyon's interlocutor of 18 December 2013 as Cunninghame of that Ilk. He is, therefore, the first Chief of the House of Cunninghame in over 200 years.

There is no heir to the baronetcy of Corsehill, though his chiefship may pass to and through the female line.

== See also ==
- Earl of Glencairn
- Barony and Castle of Corsehill
- The Lands of Doura
