= Montgomery baronets of Skelmorly (1628) =

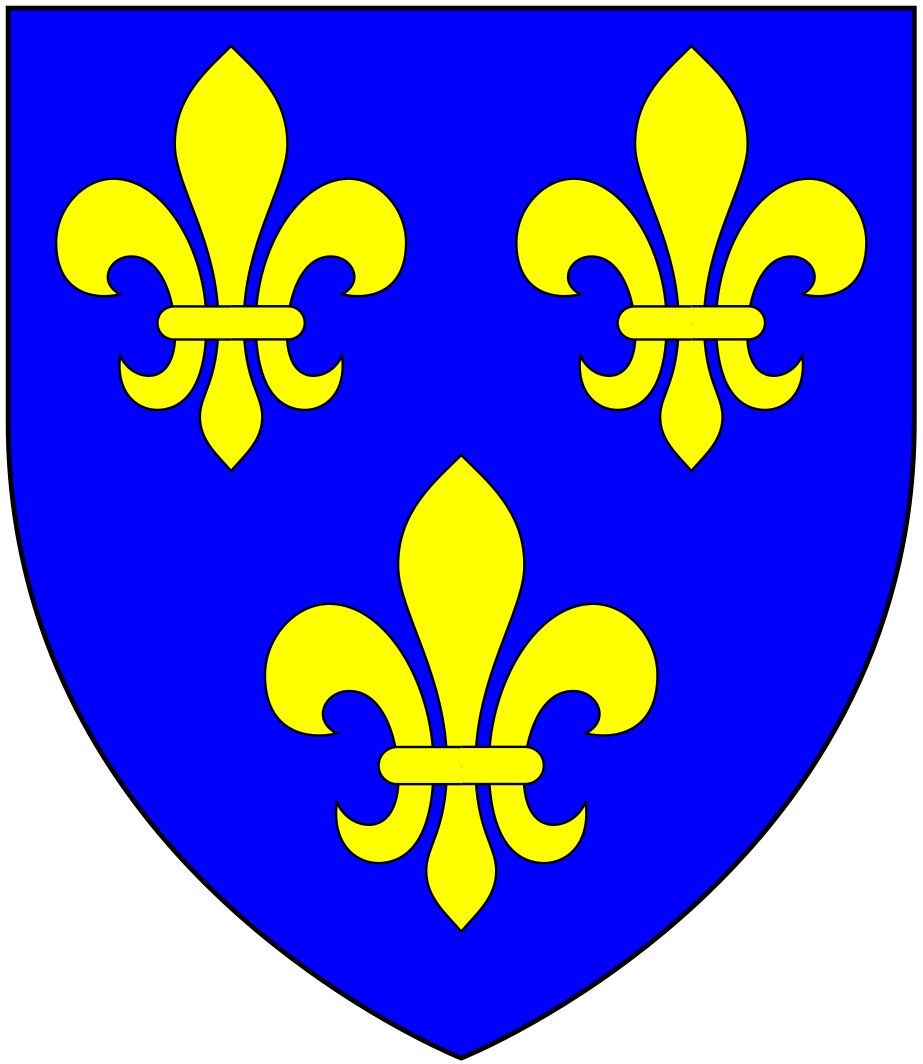
Escutcheon of the Montgomery Baronets of Skelmorly

The Montgomery baronetcy, of Skelmorly, was created in the Baronetage of Nova Scotia in January 1628 for Robert Montgomery. The sixth Baronet was one of the original Scottish representatives to the 1st Parliament of Great Britain. The title became dormant on his death in 1735.

== Montgomery baronets, of Skelmorly (1628) ==
- Sir Robert Montgomery, 1st Baronet (died 1651)
- Sir Robert Montgomery, 2nd Baronet (died 1654)
- Sir Robert Montgomery, 3rd Baronet (died 1684)
- Sir James Montgomery, 4th Baronet (died 1694)
- Sir Robert Montgomery, 5th Baronet (died 1731)
- Sir Hugh Montgomery, 6th Baronet (c. 1663–1735)

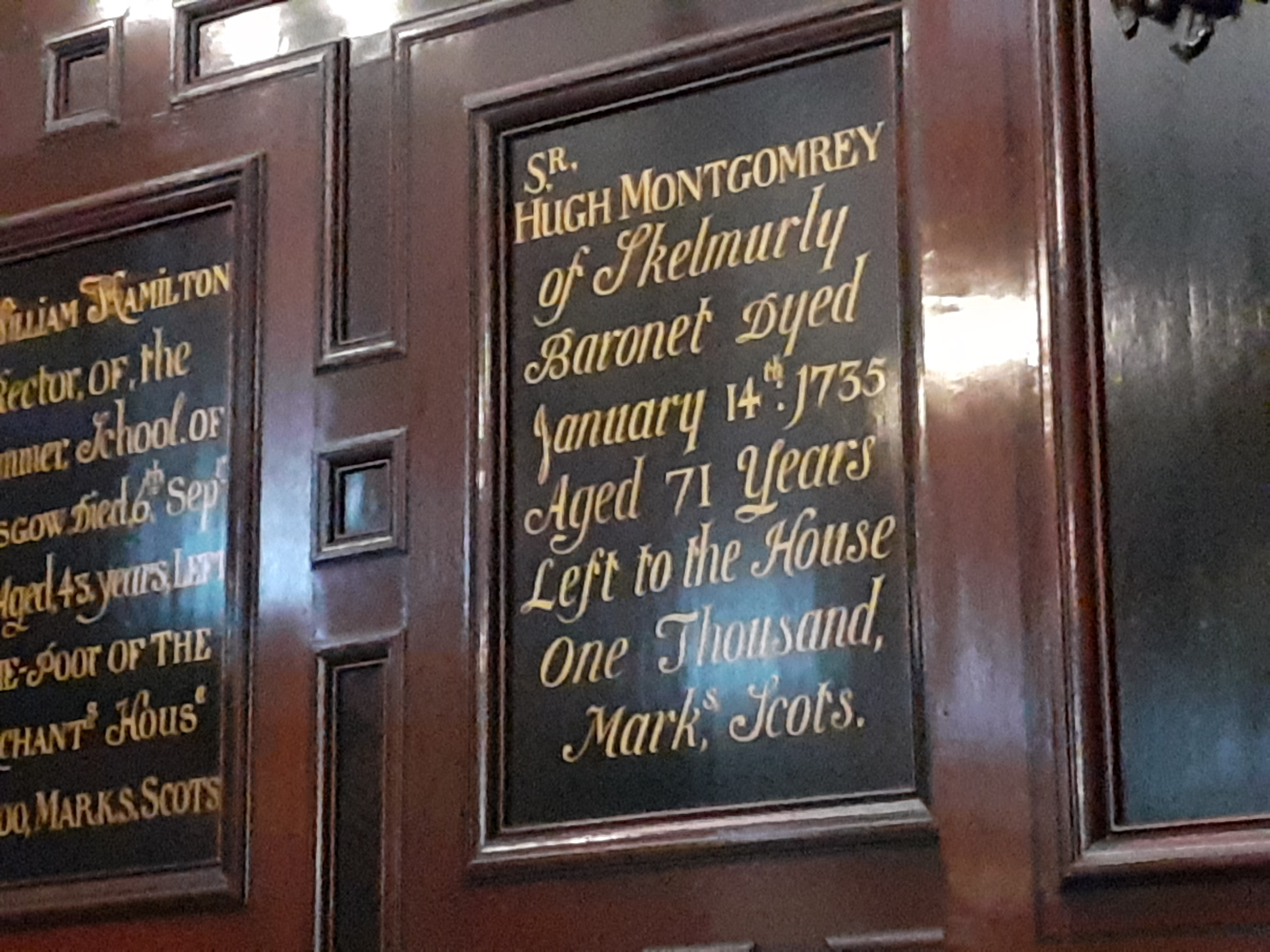
Dedication to the last Skelmorly baronet, Hugh, located in the Merchant's house, Glasgow
