= James Stuart, 1st Earl of Bute =

Scottish noble (1661–1710)

The Right Honourable Sir James Stuart MP PC
- The Earl of Bute
- Tenure: 1703–1710 (Earl of Bute); 1670/2–1710 (Baronet of Bute)
- Predecessor: New creation (Earl of Bute); Sir Dugald Stuart (Baronet of Bute)
- Successor: James Stuart, 2nd Earl of Bute
- Other titles: Baronet Stuart of Bute
- Born: 1661
- Died: 4 June 1710 (aged 48–49)
- Father: Sir Dugald Stuart
- Mother: Elizabeth Ruthven

Sir James Stuart, 3rd Baronet, of Bute, created 1st Earl of Bute, MP, PC (1661 – 4 June 1710), was a Scottish soldier, advocate, judge and politician. He was the son of Sir Dugald Stuart, 2nd Baronet, and his wife, Elizabeth Ruthven, daughter of Sir John Ruthven.

James Stuart, 1st Earl of Bute, succeeded to the title of 3rd Baronet Stuart, of Bute, in the Baronetage of Nova Scotia, in 1672. As a colonel of the militia in 1681, he helped quiet Argyll after the rebellion of the Earl of Argyll. In 1684 he was appointed Sheriff of Tarbet. He was a practising advocate in 1685. He was three times elected as Shire Commissioner for Bute (1685–1686, 1689–1693 and 1702–1703), and was Sheriff of Argyll in 1686. He was invested as a Privy Counsellor for Scotland, and was one of the commissioners to negotiate the union of Scotland with England in 1702. He was created 1st Viscount Kingarth, Lord Mountstuart, Cumra and Inchmarnock, and 1st Earl of Bute on 14 April 1703. In 1707 he opposed the union of Scotland and England.

In July 1680, he married Agnes Mackenzie, daughter of Sir George Mackenzie and Elizabeth Dickson. He married secondly, Christian Dundas, daughter of Sir William Dundas of Kincavel and Margaret Edmonston. He died on 4 June 1710 at Bath, Somerset, and was buried at Rothesay, Scotland. He was the father of two children by his first marriage,

1. Margaret Stuart (b. before 1681 – 27 April 1738) m. John Lindsay-Crawford, 1st Viscount Garnock
2. James Stuart, 2nd Earl of Bute (b. before 1696 – 28 January 1723)

by his second marriage:

- John Stewart (September 6, 1700, and died at Rome, January 11, 1738)

Parliament of Scotland
Preceded by John Boyle; Ninian Bannatyne	Shire Commissioner for Bute; 1685–1693; With: John Boyle (to 1685); David Boyle (from 1689)	Succeeded by David Boyle; William Stewart
Preceded by William Stewart	Shire Commissioner for Bute; 1702–1703; With: Robert Stewart	Succeeded by Robert Stewart; John Steuart
Peerage of Scotland
New creation	Earl of Bute; 1703–1710	Succeeded by James Stuart
Baronetage of Nova Scotia
Preceded by Dugald Stuart	Baronet (of Bute); 1670–1710	Succeeded by James Stuart
