= Ayrshire (Parliament of Scotland constituency) =

Constituency of the Old Parliament of Scotland

Before the Acts of Union 1707, the Barons of the Sheriffdom or Shire of Ayr elected commissioners to represent them in the Parliament of Scotland and in the Convention of the Estates. The number of commissioners was increased from two to four in 1690. After the Union, Ayrshire returned one Member of Parliament to the House of Commons of Great Britain and later to the House of Commons of the United Kingdom.

== List of shire commissioners ==
- 1605, 1609: Sir John Wallace of Carnell

Parliament or Convention	Commissioners			
Parliament; 12–13 October 1612	none			
Convention; 7 March 1617	William Cunningham of Caprington		Josias Steuart of Bonytown	
Parliament; 27 May–28 June 1617	William Cunningham of Caprington		Josias Steuart of Bonytown	
Convention; 25–26 January 1621	none			
Parliament; 1 June–4 August 1621	Bryce Blair of Blair		Sir John Wallace of Carnell	
Convention; 27 October–2 November 1625	John or Hew Cathcart of Carleton		David Dunbar of Enterkine	
Parliament; 15 September 1628 – 28 June 1633	Sir William Cunningham of Cunninghamhead		James Chalmers of Gaitgirth	
Convention; 28 July–7 August 1630	Bryce Blair of Blair		Alexander Cunningham of Corsehill	
Parliament; 15 May 1639 – 17 November 1641	Sir William Cunningham of Cunninghamhead		Hugh Campbell of Cessnock	
Parliament; 15 May 1639 – 17 November 1641	Henry Montgomerie (from 2 April 1640)		Hugh Campbell of Cessnock	
Convention; 22 June 1643 – 3 June 1644	Sir William Mure of Rowallan		James Fullarton of Crosbie	
Convention; 22 June 1643 – 3 June 1644	Sir John Crawfurd of Kilbirnie (from 10 April 1644)		William Cochrane of Cowdoun (from 10 April 1644)	
Parliament; 4 June 1644 – 27 March 1647	Sir John Crawfurd of Kilbirnie (from 10 April 1644)		William Cochrane of Cowdoun (from 10 April 1644)	
Parliament; 4 June 1644 – 27 March 1647	Hugh Campbell of Cessnock (from 7 January 1645)		William Cochrane of Cowdoun (from 10 April 1644)	
Parliament; 2 March 1648 – 6 June 1651	Sir William Cunningham of Cunninghamhead		James Fullarton of Fullarton	
Parliament; 2 March 1648 – 6 June 1651	Sir William Cunningham of Cunninghamhead		Sir Hugh Campbell of Cessnock (from 4 January 1649)	
During the Commonwealth of England, Scotland and Ireland, the sheriffdoms of Ayr and Renfrew were jointly represented by one Member of Parliament in the Protectorate Parliament at Westminster. After the Restoration, the Parliament of Scotland was again summoned to meet in Edinburgh.
Parliament; 1 January 1661 – 9 October 1663	Sir John Crawford of Kilbirnie (died 1662)		Robert Montgomerie of Hessilhead	
Convention; 2–4 August 1665	Sir Thomas Wallace of Craigie		John Cunningham of Brownhill	
Convention; 9–23 January 1667	Sir John Cochrane of Ochiltree		Sir Thomas Wallace of Craigie	
Parliament; 19 October 1669 – 3 March 1674	Sir John Cochrane of Ochiltree		William Blair of Blair	
Convention; 26 June–11 July 1678	William Blair of Blair			
Parliament; 28 July 1681 – 1 March 1682	Sir John Cochrane of Ochiltree		Sir John Cunningham of Lambroughton	
Parliament; 23 April 1685 – 15 June 1686	William Blair of Blair			
Convention; 14 March–24 May 1689	William Blair of Blair (died 1690)		Sir James Montgomerie of Skelmorlie	
Parliament; 5 June 1689 – 30 June 1702	William Blair of Blair (died 1690)		Sir James Montgomerie of Skelmorlie	
Parliament; 5 June 1689 – 30 June 1702	Francis Montgomerie of Giffen		Sir James Montgomerie of Skelmorlie	
Parliament; 5 June 1689 – 30 June 1702	By Act of Parliament 14 June 1690, the shire of Ayr was allocated two additional Commissioners.			
Parliament; 5 June 1689 – 30 June 1702	Sir James Montgomerie of Skelmorlie (place declared vacant 28 April 1693)	Francis Montgomerie of Giffen	William Mure of Rowallan (died 1700)	Hugh Buntine of Kilbryde
Parliament; 5 June 1689 – 30 June 1702	John Crawford of Kilbirnie	Francis Montgomerie of Giffen	William Mure of Rowallan (died 1700)	Hugh Buntine of Kilbryde
Parliament; 5 June 1689 – 30 June 1702	John Crawford of Kilbirnie	Francis Montgomerie of Giffen	John Campbell of Shankstown	Hugh Buntine of Kilbryde
Parliament; 12 November 1702 – 25 March 1707	Francis Montgomerie of Giffen	William Dalrymple of Drongan	Sir Hugh Cathcart of Carleton	John Crawford of Kilbirnie (created Viscount of Mount Crawford 10 April 1703)
Parliament; 12 November 1702 – 25 March 1707	Francis Montgomerie of Giffen	William Dalrymple of Drongan	Sir Hugh Cathcart of Carleton	John Brisbane of Bishopton, yr

== Sources ==
- Return of Members of Parliament (1878), Part II.
- Joseph Foster, Members of Parliament, Scotland (1882).
- George Edward Cokayne, The Complete Baronetage, 5 vols (1901–6).
- The Records of the Parliaments of Scotland.

== See also ==
- List of constituencies in the Parliament of Scotland at the time of the Union
