= Fairlie-Cuninghame baronets =

Baronetcy in the Baronetage of Nova Scotia

The Cuninghame, later Fairlie-Cuninghame Baronetcy, of Robertland in the County of Ayr, is a title in the Baronetage of Nova Scotia. It was created on 25 November 1630 for David Cuninghame, Master of the Works to James VI, with remainder to heirs male whatsoever. Cuninghame was a descendant of the Hon. William Cuninghame, 1st of Craigends, second son of Alexander Cunningham, 1st Earl of Glencairn (see the Earl of Glencairn). On the death of his nephew, the fourth Baronet, in circa 1708, the title became dormant. It was successfully claimed in 1778 by William Cuninghame, great-great-grandson of Sir David Cuninghame, grandfather of the first Baronet. The fifth Baronet married Margaret, daughter of William Fairlie, to whose estates he succeeded. The sixth Baronet assumed the additional surname of Fairlie. The thirteenth Baronet assumed by deed poll the surname of Fairlie-Cuninghame in 1912, in lieu of his patronymic, Cuninghame. The current holder of the title, Robert Fairlie-Cuninghame, works as a software engineer in Sydney, Australia.

== Cuninghame, later Fairlie-Cuninghame baronets, of Robertland (1630) ==
Escutcheon of the Fairlie-Cuninghame baronets, 1st and 4th quarters being for Cuninghame

- Sir David Cuninghame, 1st Baronet (died c. 1665)
- Sir David Cuninghame, 2nd Baronet (died c. 1671)
- Sir Alexander Cuninghame, 3rd Baronet (c. 1690)
- Sir David Cuninghame, 4th Baronet (died c. 1708) (dormant)
- Sir William Cuninghame, 5th Baronet (died 1781) (restored 1778)
- Sir William Cuninghame-Fairlie, 6th Baronet (died 1811)
- Sir William Cuninghame-Fairlie, 7th Baronet (died 1837)
- Sir John Cuninghame-Fairlie, 8th Baronet (1779–1852)
- Sir Charles Cuninghame-Fairlie, 9th Baronet (1780–1859)
- Sir Arthur Percy Cuninghame-Fairlie, 10th Baronet (1815–1881). He married Maria Antonia Felton in 1839, daughter Hon. William Bowman Felton, or "Belvidere," Sherbrooke, P.Q., Commissioner of Crown Lands, Lower Canada, and his wife, Anna Maria Valis, in 1839. She died in London, England, January 1897, aged 76. The couple were the parents of the 11th Baronet.
- Sir Charles Arthur Fairlie-Cuninghame, 11th Baronet (1846–1897)
- Sir Alfred Edward Fairlie-Cuninghame, 12th Baronet (1852–1901)
- Sir William Edward Fairlie-Cuninghame, 13th Baronet (1856–1929)
- Sir Hussey Burgh Fairlie-Cuninghame, 14th Baronet (1890–1939)
- Sir William Alan Fairlie-Cuninghame, 15th Baronet (1893–1981)
- Sir William Henry Fairlie-Cuninghame, 16th Baronet (1930–1999) emigrated to Australia.
- Sir Robert Henry Fairlie-Cuninghame, 17th Baronet (born 1974) currently lives in Sydney, Australia.

== See also ==
- Earl of Glencairn
- Montgomery-Cuninghame baronets
