= Sir Archibald Stewart, 1st Baronet, of Blackhall =

Sir Archibald Stewart, 1st Baronet, of Blackhall (c. 1635 – c. 1722) of Blackhall, was Commissioner of the constituency of Renfrewshire in 1667.

== Early life ==
Stewart was born in c. 1635. He was the second son of John Stewart (d. 1665), of Blackhall and Ardgowan, and Mary Stirling (b. c. 1610), who married in 1633. He was the brother of John Stewart, James Stewart of Lumlock, Walter Stewart, Mary Stewart (wife of Sir Alexander Cuninghame, 1st Baronet), David Stewart, Annabel Stewart (who married William Porterfield of that Ilk) and John Stewart.

His maternal grandparents were Sir James Stirling, of Keir, and Lady Margaret (née Home) Campbell (widow of Hugh, Lord Loudon, and daughter of Sir George Hume, of Wedderburn).

== Career ==
He succeeded his elder brother, John Stewart, who married Barbara (née Scott) Drummond of Hawthornden but died without issue in 1658, and succeeded his grandfather (in the family estate) in 1665.

He served as a Member of the Parliament of Scotland for Renfrewshire on 27 March 1667. He was created the 1st Stewart Baronet, of Blackhall, on 27 March 1667, although there is no record of its creation in the Great Seal Register.

== Personal life ==
By contract dated 12 March 1659, he married Anne Crawfurd, daughter and co-heiress of Sir John Crawfurd, 1st Baronet, of Kilbirnie, by his second wife, Magdalen Carnegie (daughter and co-heiress of David Carnegie, styled Lord Carnegie, as eldest son and heir-apparent of the 1st Earl of Southesk). She died in 1680.

- John Stewart (d. 1713), also MP for Renfrewshire; he married Rebecca Wallace, daughter of Michael Wallace.
- Patrick Stewart, who died without issue.
- Walter Stewart of Stewart Hall, Stirlingshire, who was Solicitor General for Scotland from 1720 to 1721; he married Barbara Scott.
- Margaret Stewart, who married Brisbane of Bishopton, in 1685.

His second marriage was to Dame Agnes Dalmahoy (b. 1648), a daughter of Sir Alexander Dalmahoy, of that ilk, by Marion Nisbet (a daughter of James Nisbet, of Dean). She died without issue.

His third marriage was to Mary Douglas, a daughter of Sir John Douglas, of Kelhead, Dumfrieshire. Together, they were the parents of two sons, who died unmarried, and two daughters, including:

- Agnes Stewart (1698–1759), who married Robert Bogle of Shettleston, a merchant in Glasgow.
- Margaret Stewart, who married Peter Murdoch, a merchant in Glasgow.

Apart from his three marriages, he had a natural son, Archibald Stewart (1652–1728), with an unknown woman. This son married Alice Campbell, a daughter of Lt. Robert Campbell and Isobel Dunlop, in 1679.

Sir Archibald died in c. 1722. As his eldest son predeceased him, he was succeeded, successively, in the baronetcy by his grandsons, Archibald (d. 1724) and Michael (d. 1796).

=== Descendants ===
Through his son John, he was a grandfather of two boys: Sir Archibald Stewart, 2nd Baronet and Sir Michael Stewart, 3rd Baronet, and four girls: Anne (who married her cousin, Archibald Stewart of Stewart Hall), Margaret (who married John Peadie of Roughill), Rebecca and Johanna (who married the Rev. John Gillies, a minister in Glasgow).

Baronetage of Nova Scotia
New creation	Baronet (of Greenock and Blackhall); 1667–c. 1722	Succeeded by Archibald Stewart
