= Buteshire (Parliament of Scotland constituency) =

Constituency of the Old Parliament of Scotland

Before the Act of Union 1707, the barons of the shire of Bute elected commissioners to represent them in the unicameral Parliament of Scotland and in the Convention of Estates. After 1708, Buteshire and Caithness alternated in returning one member the House of Commons of Great Britain and later to the House of Commons of the United Kingdom.

== List of shire commissioners ==
- 1644: Sir Robert Montgomery of Skelmorlie
- 1644–45: Sir James Stewart of Kirktoun, sheriff
- 1648: Laird of Kilchattane (Stewart)
- 1648: Laird of Kames (Bannatyne)
- 1651: Laird of Askog (Stewart)
- 1661–63: Sir James Stewart of Kirktoun
- 1665 (convention)
- 1667 (convention)
- 1669–70: Sir Dugald Stewart of Bute
- 1669–74,
- 1678 (convention)
- 1681–82: Ninian Bannantyne of Kames
- 1685–86: John Boyle of Kelburn
- 1689 (convention)
- 1689–93,
- 1689–98: David Boyle, later the 1st Earl of Glasgow
- 1693–1702: William Stewart of Ambrismore
- 1702–03: Sir James Stewart (or Stuart) of Bute, sheriff (ennobled 1703)
- 1702–07: Robert Stewart of Tillicoultry
- 1704–07: John Steuart of Kinwhinlick

== See also ==
- List of constituencies in the Parliament of Scotland at the time of the Union
