= Cathcart baronets =

Scottish baronetcy title

Cathcart Baronets
- Creation date: 20 January 1703 (Note: The creation date is variously given as 20 June 1703, 20 January 1703/4, 30 November 1703, and 8 April 1703.)
- Baronetage: Baronetage of Nova Scotia
- First holder: Hugh Cathcart
- Last holder: Sir Reginald Cathcart, 6th Baronet
- Remainder to: 1st baronet's heirs male whatsoever
- Status: Dormant/extinct
- Former seats: Carleton Castle; Killochan Castle; Cluny Castle; Tittenhurst Park
- Motto: BY FAITH WE ARE SAVED

The Cathcart baronetcy, of Carleton Castle, County Ayr, was created in the Baronetage of Nova Scotia on 20 January 1703 for Hugh Cathcart, MP for Ayrshire 1702–07. As the baronetcy was created "with remainder to heirs male whatsoever," the title became either extinct or dormant upon the death of the sixth baronet in 1916.

The first baronet married the daughter of Sir Patrick Broun, 1st Baronet of Colstoun in 1695 and was succeeded by his son, Sir John Cathcart. The second baronet married in 1717, Catherine Dundas, daughter of Robert Dundas, Lord Arniston, with no children. In 1729, he married Elizabeth, daughter of Sir John Kennedy, Baronet of Culzean, and had three sons. He was succeeded by his two eldest sons, respectively the third and fourth baronets.

The fifth baronet was the great-nephew of the two previous baronets as the grandson of their younger brother. He married Lady Eleanor Kennedy, daughter of Archibald Kennedy, Earl of Cassilis and granddaughter of the 1st Marquess of Ailsa.

The sixth baronet was married to Emily Pringle Gordon, widow of the illegitimate son of the wealthy Capt. John Gordon. The Gordons, including Emily, were notorious for their role in the Highland Clearances. She inherited considerable land from her late husband and she and the sixth baronet resided at Cluny Castle in Scotland. Their English country seat was Tittenhurst Park, later owned separately by John Lennon (1969–71) and Ringo Starr (1973–88). They had one daughter who died in infancy.

== Cathcart baronets, of Carleton (1704) ==
- Sir Hew (or Hugh) Cathcart, 1st Baronet (died March 1723)
- Sir John Cathcart, 2nd Baronet (died before 1765), son of the first baronet
- Sir John Cathcart, 3rd Baronet (1731–1783), son of the second baronet
- Sir Andrew Cathcart, 4th Baronet (1742–1828), younger brother of the third baronet
- Sir John Andrew Cathcart, 5th Baronet (18 February 1810 – 25 March 1878), great-nephew of the fourth baronet
- Sir Reginald Archibald Edward Cathcart, 6th Baronet (19 December 1838 – 14 May 1916), son of the fifth baronet
