= John Campbell of Shankstown =

Scottish soldier

Colonel John Campbell of Shankstown was a Scottish soldier.

The second son of James Campbell, 2nd Earl of Loudoun and brother of Hugh Campbell, 3rd Earl of Loudoun and Sir James Campbell of Lawers, he sat in the Parliament of Scotland for Ayrshire from 1700 to 1702.

He died without issue.
