= William Cunningham, 4th Earl of Glencairn =

Scottish nobleman

William Cunningham, 4th Earl of Glencairn, 5th Lord of Kilmaurs (c. 1480–1548) was a Scottish nobleman, soldier, and "notorious intriguer".

== Family ==
He was the eldest son and heir of Cuthbert Cunningham, 3rd Earl of Glencairn, by his spouse, Lady Marjory, the eldest daughter of Archibald Douglas, 5th Earl of Angus. Cuthbert was the son of Robert Cunyngham / Cunningham, 2nd Earl of Glencairn, 3rd Lord of Kilmaurs by his wife Elizabeth Lindsay, daughter of Lord Lindsay of Byers.

Finlaystone House and estate in Inverclyde was the seat of the Earl of Glencairn and chief of clan Cunningham from 1405 to 1796.

== Divided loyalties ==
While still Lord Kilmaurs, this nobleman was one of the principal adherents of the English Court in Scotland, and accepted a pension from King Henry VIII. He was one of the party which joined the force of the Earls of Arran and Lennox on 23 November 1524, when they took possession of Edinburgh, and endeavoured to withdraw the young king James V from the Queen Mother.

He was appointed Lord High Treasurer of Scotland on 26 June 1526 but held the office only until 29 October the same year.

In 1538 he accompanied David Bethune, Bishop of Mirepoix, afterwards a celebrated cardinal, to France to conclude a treaty for James V's marriage with Mary of Guise.

== Intrigues ==
Lord Kilmaurs succeeded as 4th Earl of Glencairn upon the death of his father just before 1542, and he and his eldest son, Alexander, now Lord Kilmaurs, were engaged in all the intrigues of the Anglo-Scottish Party at this period of history, and supported the religious Reformers.

In 1542 the earl was taken prisoner by the English at the Battle of Solway Moss and committed to the custody of the Duke of Norfolk, but was released on payment of a ransom of a thousand pounds and subscribing by his own hand to support Henry VIII's project of a marriage between the young Prince Edward and the Scottish Queen. In March 1543 he met with the English ambassador Ralph Sadler and the Earl of Angus at the Blackfriar's Monastery in Edinburgh. Sadler interrogated the Scottish earls on the progress they had made on Henry VIII's projects. Glencairn said he had little silver, but would willingly fight France with 5000 men for Henry. Later on the same day, Glencairn offered to put his promises in writing, and at night he brought them to Sadler. Glencairn added that if he was appointed a keeper of Mary, Queen of Scots, Henry would be sure to have her in his hands one way or another.

Allied with the Earl of Lennox in 1544 he was, with his 500 vassals as spearmen, attacked on Glasgow Muir by Regent Arran and defeated "with great slaughter", his second son amongst the slain. Glencairn managed to flee to Dumbarton, almost alone, and in September he and his son Lord Kilmaurs abandoned the cause of Henry. In November Glencairn, now pardoned by the Regent, was with the latter's army that laid siege to Coldingham, then held by the English, but which was dispersed by an English force from Berwick.

In March 1544 Glencairn and his son renewed their communications with the English government in support of the English Party in Scotland, and is said to have been party to the assassination of Cardinal Beaton. In July 1547, Glencairn discussed a potential invasion of Scotland with Protector Somerset, with the object of establishing a Protestant Reformation in Scotland. Glencairn died in March 1548, and was then receiving a French pension for loyalty to the Auld Alliance.

== Marriage ==
William Cunningham was twice married, firstly to Catherine Borthwick, second daughter of William Borthwick, 3rd Lord Borthwick, and had issue with her:

- Alexander Cunningham, 5th Earl of Glencairn, the zealous Protestant reformer.
- Hon. Andrew Cunningham, ancestor of the Cunninghams of Corsehill, later baronets.
- Hon. Hugh Cunningham, progenitor of the Cunninghams of Carlung.
- Hon. Robert Cunningham, ancestor of the Cunninghams of Montgrenan.
- Hon. William Cunningham, Bishop of Argyll.
- Lady Elizabeth Cunningham, married to Sir John Cunningham of Caprington.
- Lady Janet Cunningham, married to Robert Ferguson.

He married secondly to Margaret (or Elizabeth) Campbell, daughter and heiress of John Campbell of West Loudon.

== See also ==
- Clan Cunningham
- Earl of Glencairn

Peerage of Scotland
Preceded by Cuthbert Cunningham	Earl of Glencairn c. 1541–1548	Succeeded by Alexander Cunningham
