= David Boyle, 1st Earl of Glasgow =

Scottish politician (c.1666–1733)

The Right Honourable The Earl of Glasgow PC
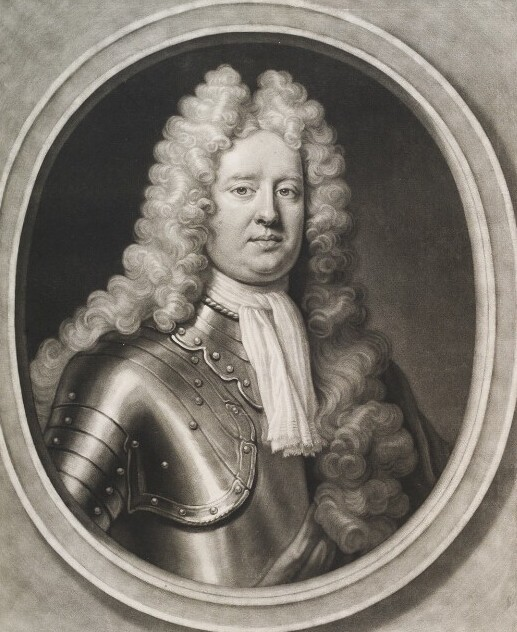

Scottish Representative Peer in the House of Lords
- In office 13 February 1707 – 21 September 1710
- Preceded by: Established

Commissioner of the Parliament of Scotland for Bute
- In office 1689–1699
- Preceded by: James Stuart, 1st Earl of Bute
- Succeeded by: William Stewart

Rector of the University of Glasgow
- In office 1690–1691
- Preceded by: Robert Ramsay
- Succeeded by: Sir John Maxwell

Personal details
- Born: David Boyle, esq. c. 1666 Kelburn Castle, Fairlie, North Ayrshire, Scotland
- Died: 31 October 1733 Fairlie, North Ayrshire
- Spouses: Margaret Lindsay-Crawford (m. 1687; died 1695) Jean Mure (m. 1697; died 1724)
- Children: John Boyle, 2nd Earl of Glasgow; Lady Jean Boyle Mure
- Occupation: Politician

David Boyle, 1st Earl of Glasgow (c. 1666 – 31 October 1733) was a Scottish politician. He was the last Treasurer-depute before the Union with England.

== Early life ==
David Boyle was born circa 1666 at Kelburn Castle in North Ayrshire, Scotland. He was the son of John Boyle of Kelburn, a Shire Commissioner to the Parliament of Scotland for Bute, and Marion Steuart, daughter of Sir Walter Steuart of Allanton

== Career ==
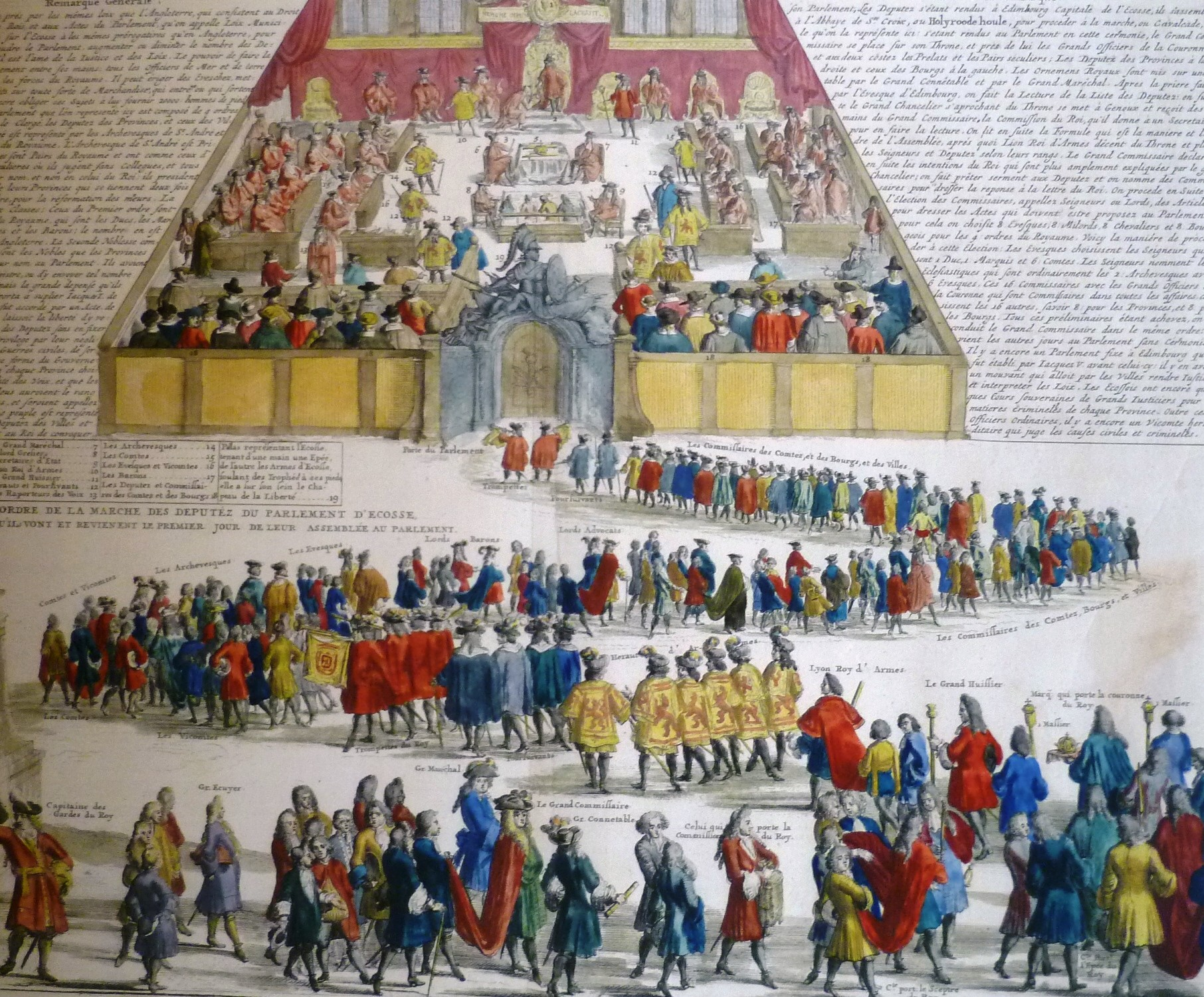
French illustration of an opening of the Scottish Parliament, ca. 18th Century

From 1689 to 1699, Boyle was the Commissioner to the Parliament of Scotland from the Bute constituency. In 1697, he was invested as Privy Counsellor. He was Rector of Glasgow University from 1690 to 1691, as well as the last Treasurer-depute before the Union with England.

The Earl was a supporter of the Acts of Union, and after their passage, he sat as a Scottish representative peer from 1707 to 1710, serving alongside his first wife's nephew, John Lindsay, 19th Earl of Crawford. In Scotland, some claimed that union would enable Scotland to recover from the financial disaster wrought by the Darien scheme through English assistance and the lifting of measures put in place through the Alien Act 1705 to force the Scottish Parliament into compliance with the Act of Settlement. As many Commissioners had invested heavily in the Darien Scheme, they believed that they would receive compensation for their losses of which Article 15 granted £398,085 10s sterling to Scotland, a sum known as The Equivalent, to offset future liability towards the English national debt, that was in essence used as a means of compensation for investors in the Company of Scotland's Darien Scheme. In total, £20,000 (£240,000 Scots) was dispatched to Scotland, of which £12,325, more than 60% of the funding, was distributed to Boyle and The Duke of Queensbury, the Commissioner in Parliament.

He was appointed Lord High Commissioner to the General Assembly of the Church of Scotland in 1706, and in 1707 to 1710. He was also Lord Clerk Register prior to 1714.

During the Jacobite rising of 1715 he was a staunch supporter of the British-Hanoverian government and even raised and armed troops at his own expense.

=== Peerage ===
On 31 January 1699, he was raised to the Peerage of Scotland as Lord Boyle of Kelburn, Stewartoun, Cumbrae, Fenwick, Largs and Dalry, with a special remainder to all of his heirs male whatsoever. On 12 April 1703, he advanced to the titles of Viscount of Kelburn and Earl of Glasgow, with a special remainder to all of his heirs male whatsoever.

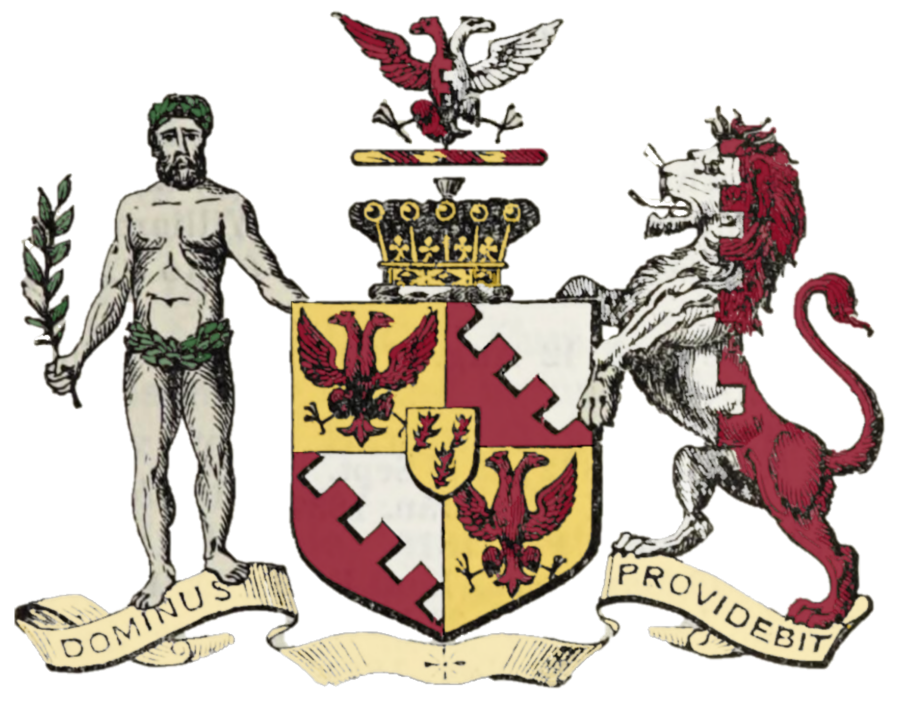
Coat of Arms.

== Personal life ==
On 19 April 1687, he married Margaret Lindsay-Crawford, daughter of the Hon. Patrick Crawford of Kilbirney, who was the second son of John Lindsay, 17th Earl of Crawford and the brother of the 18th Earl of Crawford. Together, they had:

- John Boyle, 2nd Earl of Glasgow (1688–1740), who married Helen Morison, daughter of William Morison of Prestongrange.
- Patrick Boyle, Lord Shewalton (d. 1761), who did not marry.
- Charles Boyle, (c.1691–1759). There is no record that he married. He was Collector of Customs at Irvine. He traveled to America and obtained a grant of land in Long Island, New York and later returned to England.
- William Boyle, (dates unknown)

On 16 June 1697, Boyle married for the second time to Jean Mure, the daughter and heir of William Mure of Rowallan (d. 1700), who was the grandson of Sir William Mure of Rowallan (1594–1657). Before her death in 1724, they had four daughters, including:

- Lady Margaret Boyle. Married Patrick Craufurd of Drumsoy.
- Lady Jean Boyle Mure of Rowallan (d. 1729), who married the Hon. Sir James Campbell (c. 1680–1745) the third and youngest son of James Campbell, 2nd Earl of Loudoun (d. 1684) and Lady Margaret Montgomerie, the daughter of Hugh Montgomerie, 7th Earl of Eglinton, in 1720.
- Lady Elizabeth Boyle, (d. young)
- Lady Anne Boyle, (d. young)

In 1711, an engraving was made of The Earl by John Smith, based on a portrait of him done by Jonathan Richardson.

=== Descendants ===
Lord Boyle's grandson, John Boyle, 3rd Earl of Glasgow, succeeded his eldest son, the 2nd Earl, to his titles in 1740. He married Elizabeth Ross, daughter of George Ross, 13th Lord Ross

Lord Boyle's grandson, James Mure Campbell, succeeded to the estate of Rowallan, and later became the 5th Earl of Loudoun. James married Flora Macleod, daughter of John Macleod of Raasay, with whom he had Flora Mure-Campbell, his heir and the 6th Countess of Loudoun. She married Francis Rawdon-Hastings, 1st Marquess of Hastings, in 1804.

Parliament of Great Britain
| Preceded by Established | Scottish Representative Peer in the House of Lords; 1707–1710 | Succeeded by |
Parliament of Scotland
| Preceded by John Boyle; The Earl of Bute | Shire Commissioner for Bute; 1689–1699; With: The Earl of Bute (to 1693); William Stewart (from 1693) | Succeeded by William Stewart |
Academic offices
| Preceded by Robert Ramsay | Rector of the University of Glasgow; 1690–1691 | Succeeded by Sir John Maxwell of Nether Park |
Peerage of Scotland
| New creation | Earl of Glasgow; 1703–1733 | Succeeded by John Boyle |
| New creation | Lord Boyle; 1699–1733 | Succeeded by John Boyle |
