= Blackhall Manor =

Tower house in Paisley, Scotland

Coordinates: 55.83766°N 4.41131°W

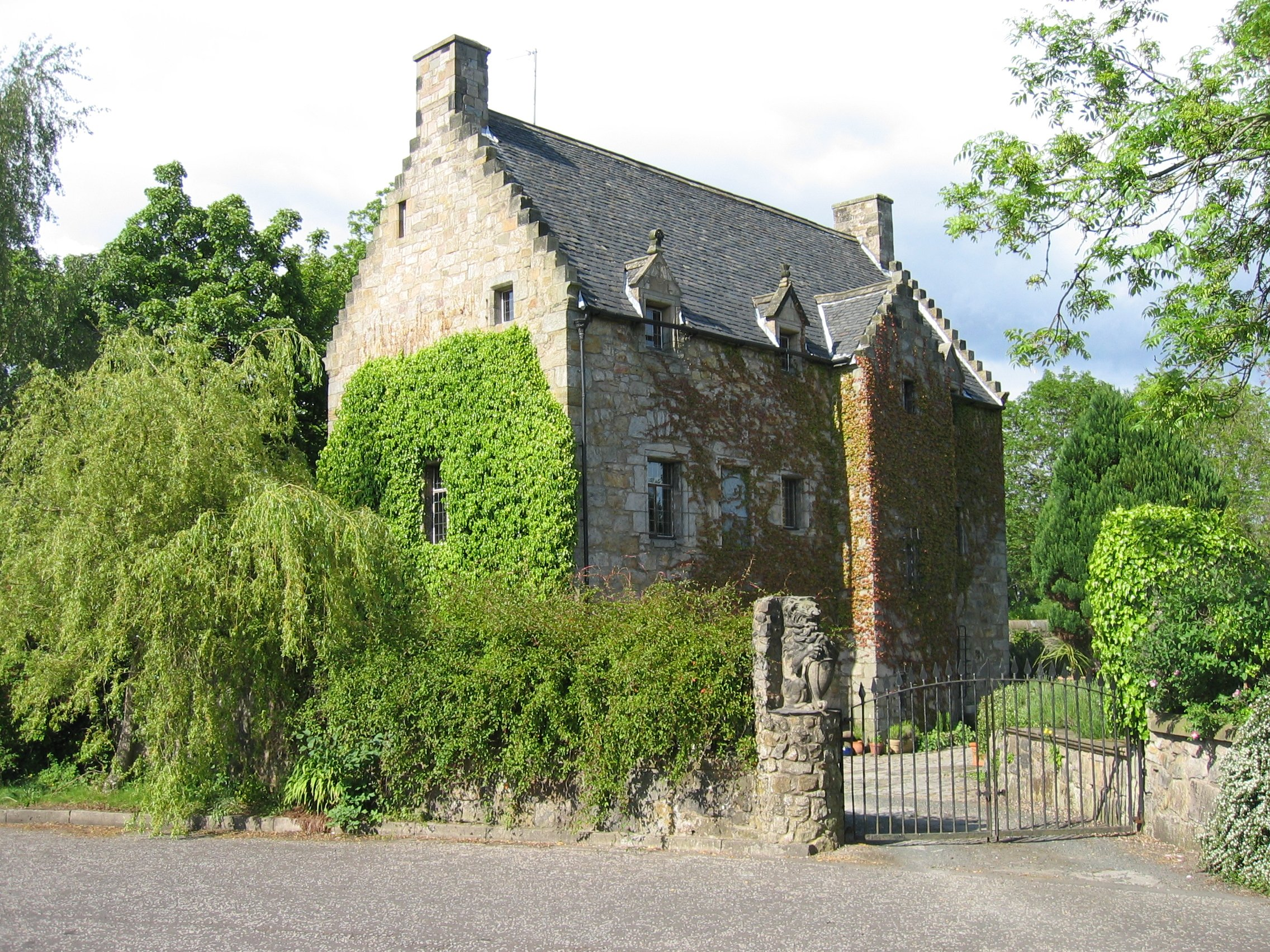
Blackhall Manor after restoration

Blackhall Manor is a tower house in Paisley in Renfrewshire, in the western central Lowlands of Scotland. It dates to the sixteenth century, although parts may be older, and formerly belonged to the Stewart or Shaw-Stewart family. It was designated as a Category B listed building in 1971.

== History ==
The first house on the site was built by the Norman knight Walter fitz Alan in about 1160. In 1396 Robert III of Scotland, King of Scots, gave the property to Sir John Stewart, his natural son. According to a record book now lost, barony courts were regularly held there in the sixteenth century. In 1667 Archibald Stewart was made a Baronet of Nova Scotia by Charles II, and was the first baronet of Greenock and Blackhall.

By the 1820s Blackhall had become a farm-house; in the 1840s the farmer built a new house nearby, and the roof of the old one was taken off to save on tax. The structure was used as a store-house, a cattle byre and a coal shed. The Shaw-Stewart family donated it to the Burgh of Paisley in 1940. In 1978 it was judged to have become so dangerous that demolition was proposed. It was completely rebuilt and restored in 1982–1983.

No information about the evolution of the tower over the centuries is available, but the presence of a 14th-century fireplace jamb, the different style of windows in the staircase tower from the rest of the building and its relatively poor bonding with the main block suggest that the tower house was originally built as a hall house and enlarged in the 16th century with the addition of another storey and attic, stair tower, larger windows and a new ground-floor entrance. More windows were added in the late 16th or early 17th centuries.

== See also ==
- List of listed buildings in Paisley, Renfrewshire
- Stewart, later Shaw-Stewart baronets, of Greenock and Blackhall
