= Kelburn Castle =

Kelburn Castle and Country Centre
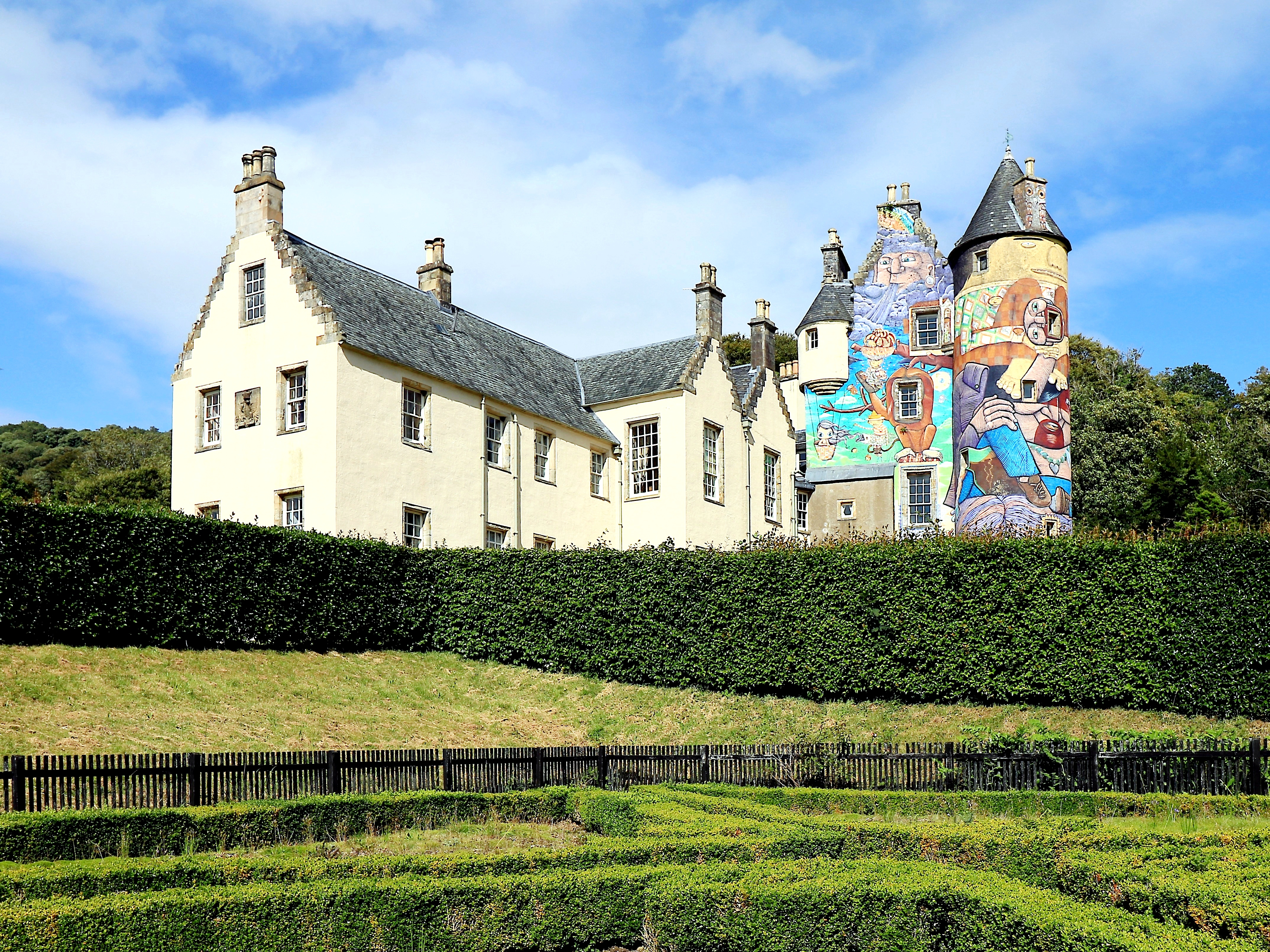
- Kelburn Castle in 2025
- Interactive map of Kelburn Castle and Country Centre
- 55.7708°N 4.8433°W
- Location: Fairlie, North Ayrshire

History
- Built: 16th century (tower); 1722 (north-west range); 1880 (north-east range)
- Built for: David Boyle, 1st Earl of Glasgow (1722); George Boyle, 6th Earl of Glasgow (1880)

Listed Building – Category A
- Designated: 14 April 1971
- Reference no.: LB7294

Inventory of Gardens and Designed Landscapes in Scotland
- Official name: Kelburn Castle
- Criteria: Work of Art; Historical; Architectural; Scenic
- Designated: 1 July 1987
- Reference no.: GDL00233

Kelburn Castle is a large house near Fairlie, North Ayrshire, Scotland. It is the seat of the Earl of Glasgow. Originally built in the thirteenth century (the original keep forms the core of the house) it was remodelled in the sixteenth century. In 1700, the first Earl made further extensions to the house in a manner not unlike a French château, which is virtually how it appears today. In 1977 the house and grounds opened to the public as a country park. It is one of the oldest castles in Scotland and has been continuously inhabited by the same family for longer than any other. The castle is protected as a category A listed building, while the grounds are included in the Inventory of Gardens and Designed Landscapes in Scotland.

When it was found in 2007 that the castle's concrete facing would soon need replacing, Lord Glasgow invited four Brazilian graffiti artists to decorate the walls. This was still in place in 2011, when the Earl sought permission from Historic Scotland to keep the graffiti permanently.

== History ==
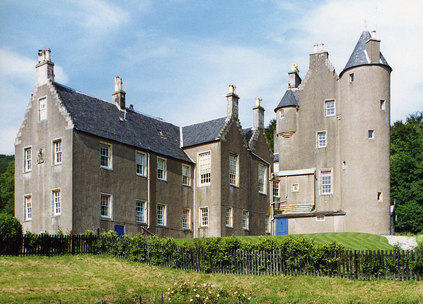
Kelburn Castle in 1994

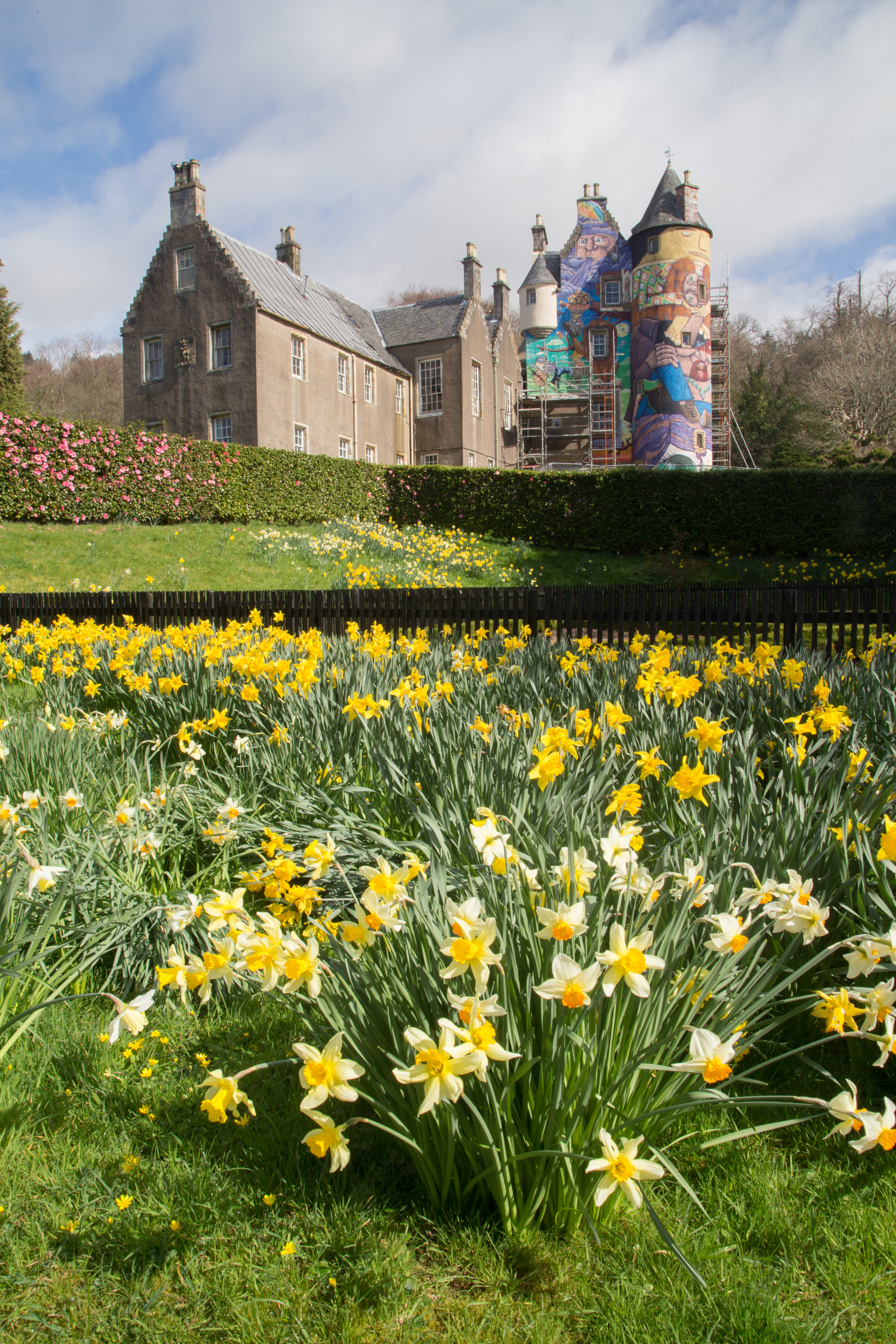
Kelburn Castle in Spring

The Boyle family have been in possession of the lands of Kelburn since the 12th century.

The castle is thought to have been built in the 13th century and, although no one knows the exact date of the first stone laid, the castle was there during the Battle of Largs, which was fought between the Scots and the Norwegians in 1263.

The first structure was a wood tower. This wooden tower was replaced in the 1200s with a stone Norman Keep, sections of which are still in use today.

In the late 16th century a tower house was built. This replaced an earlier structure, and may incorporate parts of the earlier masonry its eastern part. In the 17th century, orchards and gardens are recorded at Kelburn. David Boyle (1666–1733), a member of the Parliament of Scotland, was created Earl of Glasgow in 1703. He began the new north-west wing of the house, which was completed circa 1722. The 1st Earl doubled the size of the building by adding a William-and-Mary style mansion house onto the Castle at a slight angle, built to the Earl’s instructions by the well-known mason, Thomson Caldwell.

George Boyle, 6th Earl of Glasgow (1825–1890), added the north-east wing in 1880.

The 7th Earl of Glasgow, who was made Governor of New Zealand in 1892, provides the links between the Kelburn Estate and Kelburn in New Zealand. Many of his souvenirs still reside at the castle, and in the Estate’s Museum.

Following the opening of the grounds to the public, the estate buildings and stables were converted in 1980, to provide a tea room, shop and visitor information.

== Graffiti project ==
In 2007 experts told the owners of Kelburn Castle that its concrete facing would eventually need to be replaced to avoid further damage to the stonework. At the suggestion of his children, Lord Glasgow invited four Brazilian graffiti artists (Nunca, Nina and Os Gêmeos twins) to paint the walls. Historic Scotland agreed to the project, on the basis that the graffiti would be removed when the castle was re-harled. The project was featured on the BBC television programme The Culture Show. Also in 2007, Kelburn featured in another BBC programme, Crisis at the Castle which documented the financial problems of running the castle.

In September 2010 it was reported that Historic Scotland were putting pressure on Lord Glasgow to remove the graffiti, although this was later denied by both parties. In August 2011 it was reported that the Earl had formally written to Historic Scotland asking permission to keep the graffiti as a permanent feature.

== Fire damage ==
The castle suffered minor fire damage on 16 February 2009, as a result of an electrical fault. The fire service was called to a blaze at around 1:45 am where flames had engulfed a top-floor room and spread to the roof. Around 25 firefighters battled the blaze for more than five hours before it was extinguished at around 7:20 am.

== Public use ==
The 10th Earl of Glasgow, Patrick Boyle, and his family continue to reside in the castle. It was his decision to open the estate to the public in 1977, converting the grounds and ancillary buildings into outdoor recreation areas, a café, a gift shop, and other facilities, as well as allowing access to the interior of the castle through guided tours.

The grounds are open to the public for most of the year, with seasonal opening hours varying between Easter and winter. The estate includes several outdoor recreation areas, including a themed trail within the woodland.

A variety of events take place on the estate throughout the year, including seasonal activities. In July, it hosts the Kelburn Garden Party, a music and arts festival with multiple stages across the site. The estate may also be used for weddings and other private events.

The estate provides camping accommodation, including pre-erected tents and areas designated for personal tents or campervans.

== The Kel Burn ==
The Kel burn has helped form the glen over thousands of years. In the space of just over half a mile, it rises on the moors over 800 feet above the castle and drops dramatically, by way of many waterfalls and gorges, to the sea. The glen is a wealth of wild flowers and ferns, shrubs and trees. Walks up the glen reveal views across Largs, the Firth of Clyde and over to Arran.
