= William Cunningham =

William Cunningham may refer to:

== Academics and ecclesiastics ==
- William Cunningham (economist) (1849–1919), English economist and Archdeacon of Ely
- William Cunningham (theologian) (1805–1861), Scottish theologian
- William H. Cunningham (born 1944), former president of the University of Texas at Austin
- William T. Cunningham (1930–1997), American Roman Catholic priest

== Noblemen ==
- Cunningham baronets of Cunninghamhead, Ayr in the Baronetage of Nova Scotia:
  - Sir William Cunningham, 1st Baronet (died c. 1640)
  - Sir William Cunningham, 2nd Baronet (died 1670)
  - Sir William Cunningham, 3rd Baronet (died 1724)
- William Cunningham, 4th Earl of Glencairn (c. 1490–1547), Scottish noble
- William Cunningham, 6th Earl of Glencairn (c. 1520–c. 1578), Scottish noble
- William Cunningham, 8th Earl of Glencairn (1575–1630), Scottish noble
- William Cunningham, 9th Earl of Glencairn (1610–1664), Scottish noble

== Politicians ==
- W. Pete Cunningham (1929–2010), American politician and soldier
- William Cunningham (Illinois politician) (born 1976), member of the Illinois Senate
- William J. Cunningham (Illinois politician), member of the Illinois House of Representatives
- W. T. Cunningham (1871–1952), American judge and state legislator
- Bill Cunningham (judge) (William Harold Cunningham, born 1944), American lawyer and justice of the Kentucky Supreme Court

== Soldiers ==
- Bloody Bill Cunningham (1756–1787), American Loyalist commander
- William Cunningham (lawyer) (1883–1959), New Zealand major general and lawyer

== Sportsmen ==
=== Association footballers ===
- Bill Cunningham (footballer) (fl. 1892–1893), Irish footballer
- William Cunningham (footballer) (1899–1934), English footballer
- Willie Cunningham (footballer, born 1925) (1925–2000), Scottish footballer
- Willie Cunningham (Northern Irish footballer) (1930–2007), also football manager
- Willie Cunningham (footballer, born 1938), Scottish footballer

=== Other sportsmen ===
- Bill Cunningham (cricketer) (1900–1984), New Zealand cricketer
- Bill Cunningham (infielder) (1886–1946), American Major League Baseball player
- Bill Cunningham (outfielder) (1894–1953), American Major League Baseball player
- Bill Cunningham (rugby union, born 1874) (1874–1927), New Zealand rugby union player
- Bill Cunningham (rugby union, born 1900), Ireland and British Lions international rugby union player
- Billy Cunningham (born 1943), American National Basketball Association Hall-of-Fame player and head coach
- W. A. Cunningham (1886–1958), American college football and basketball coach
- William Cunningham (American football) (1872–1957), American college football player
- William Cunningham (basketball) (born 1974), American professional basketball player

== Others ==
- Bill Cunningham (American photographer) (1929–2016), American fashion photographer for The New York Times
- William Cunningham (body snatcher) (1807–1871), Irish-American body snatcher
- Bill Cunningham (musician) (born 1950), American musician, original bass guitarist / keyboardist for the Box Tops
- Bill Cunningham (talk show host) (born 1947), American radio and television talk show host, commentator, attorney and entrepreneur
- William Meredith Cunningham (1901–1967), American writer
- Bill Cunningham (journalist) (William Robert Cunningham, 1932–2024), Canadian television journalist

== See also ==
- William Cuningham, 16th-century English physician, astrologer and engraver
- Bill Cunningham (disambiguation)
- Willie Cunningham (disambiguation)
- William Cuninghame of Lainshaw (1775–1849), Scottish writer on biblical prophecy
- William Cunninghame (1731–1799), Scottish tobacco merchant
- Sir William Montgomery-Cuninghame, 9th Baronet (1834–1897), Scottish soldier, politician and Victoria Cross recipient
