= Glencairn Aisle =

Chapel in East Ayrshire, Scotland

- Riccarton, Ayrshire, Scotland grid reference NS414407
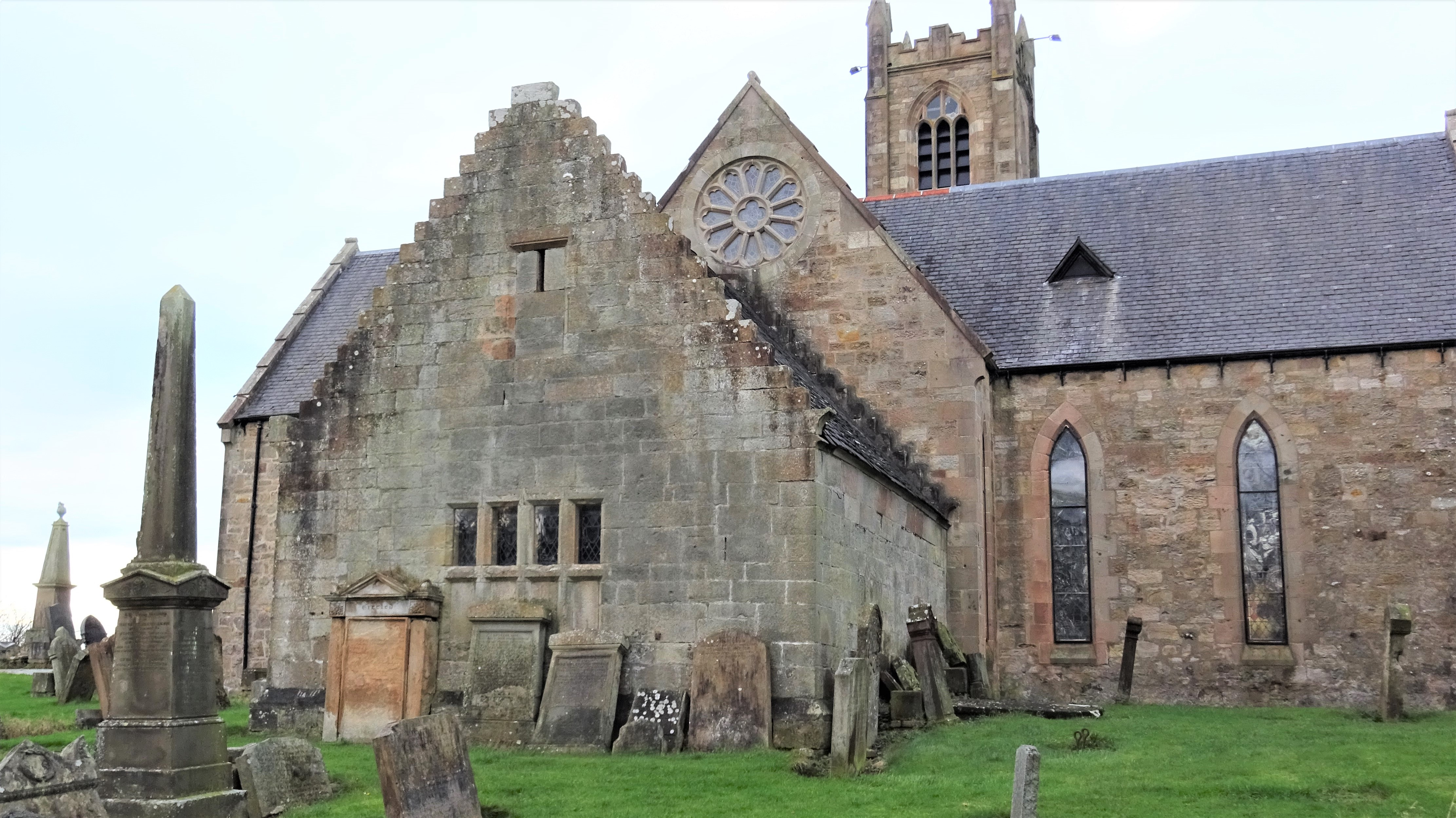
- The Glencairn Aisle and St Maurs-Glencairn Church

Site information
- Type: A Burial Aisle and crypt
- Owner: Clan Cunningham
- Open to the public: By arrangement
- Condition: Maintained

Location
- Glencairn Aisle
- Location within Scotland
- Coordinates: 55.634464°N 4.5200130°W

Site history
- Built: 16th century
- Built by: James Cunningham, 7th Earl of Glencairn
- In use: 16th to 20th centuries
- Materials: Ashlar masonry

The Glencairn Aisle or Glencairn Vault at Kilmaurs, East Ayrshire is a Category B Listed vaulted sepulchral chapel. Built as a place for private contemplation and prayer, it also contains a large memorial monument, as well as the burial crypt of the Cunningham Earls of Glencairn and their family members. An 'aisle' is defined as a structure normally attached to a church, which may have burial crypt below, a family pew above, and sometimes a retiring room, as at the Glencairn Aisle.

It houses an exceptional ornately carved stone mural monument dated 1600 that commemorates James Cunningham, the 7th Earl of Glencairn, his countess, Margaret Campbell and eight of their children. It is the oldest such 'Glorious Tomb' monument built in the 17th century in Ayrshire and one of the oldest post-reformation monument in Scotland. The other Ayrshire examples are the Kennedy or Bargany Aisle at Ballantrae of circa 1601, the Skelmorlie Aisle at Largs of 1639, the Crauford Monument at Kilbirnie and the Hamilton Aisle at Dunlop of 1641.

The aisle is associated with St Maurs-Glencairn parish church that was dedicated to either the Virgin Mary or St Mora or Maura of Little Cumbrae, and was gifted to Kelso Abbey in 1170 by Robertus filli Wernebaldi, an ancestor of the Cunninghams. In 1413, it was endowed as a college of secular canons with a provost and several prebendaries. In 1600, James, seventh Earl of Glencairn, is said to have added the Glencairn Aisle or Vault to the then existing east-west oriented church building. In the aisle there is the aforementioned early 17th century mural monument (1600) commissioned by James, Seventh Earl of Glencairn for himself, his countess, Margaret, his children and close relatives.

Memorial plaques to members of the cadet branches of Caprington, Corsehill and Robertland are also present on the walls.

== The Cunninghams, Earls of Glencairn ==
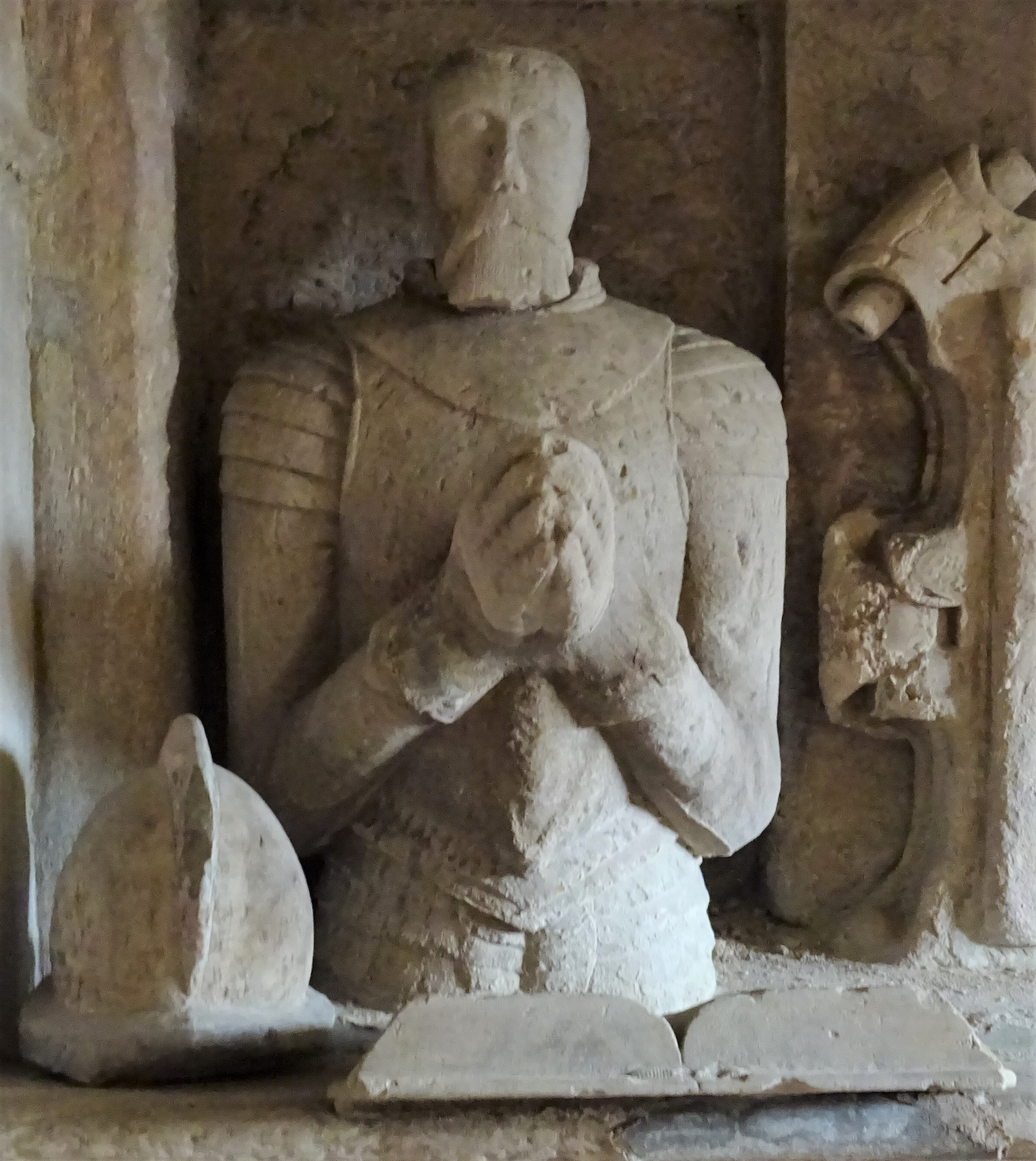
James Cunningham, 7th Earl Glencairn

Kilmaurs has had strong links with the Cunningham family who were also associated with the tenement or lands of Lamburgton (sic) for a significant period during their rise to power, granted to the family by royal charter in 1319 following the Cunningham support at the Battle of Bannockburn in 1314. The Cunningham chiefs had a weaker connection with the Barony of Kilmaurs after 1484 when Finlaystone became the family seat; Sir William Cunningham of Kilmaurs had married Margaret Denniston, co-heir to Sir Robert Denniston in 1405, and the dowry included the baronies of Denniston and Finlaystone in Renfrewshire, the lands of Kilmaronock in Dunbartonshire, Redhall and Colintoun in Mid-Lothian and the Barony of Glencairn in Dumfriesshire.

In 1786 James, the fourteenth Earl of Glencairn, broke the centuries-old connection of the Cunningham family with the area by selling the barony and estate of Kilmaurs, including Kilmaurs Place, to the Marchioness of Titchfield.

== The Collegiate Church ==
Kilmaurs church was endowed in 1413 by Sir William Cunninghame as a secular, not being subject to or bound by religious rule, collegiate church with associated buildings to accommodate at least nine prebends, two clerks, choristers and servants. Maybole was the only other collegiate church in Ayrshire. These institutions were private chapels on an elaborate scale and their purpose was to make more lavish provision than could be made at an altar or chapel within a church for masses said for the soul of the founder, his family, their ancestors and descendants.

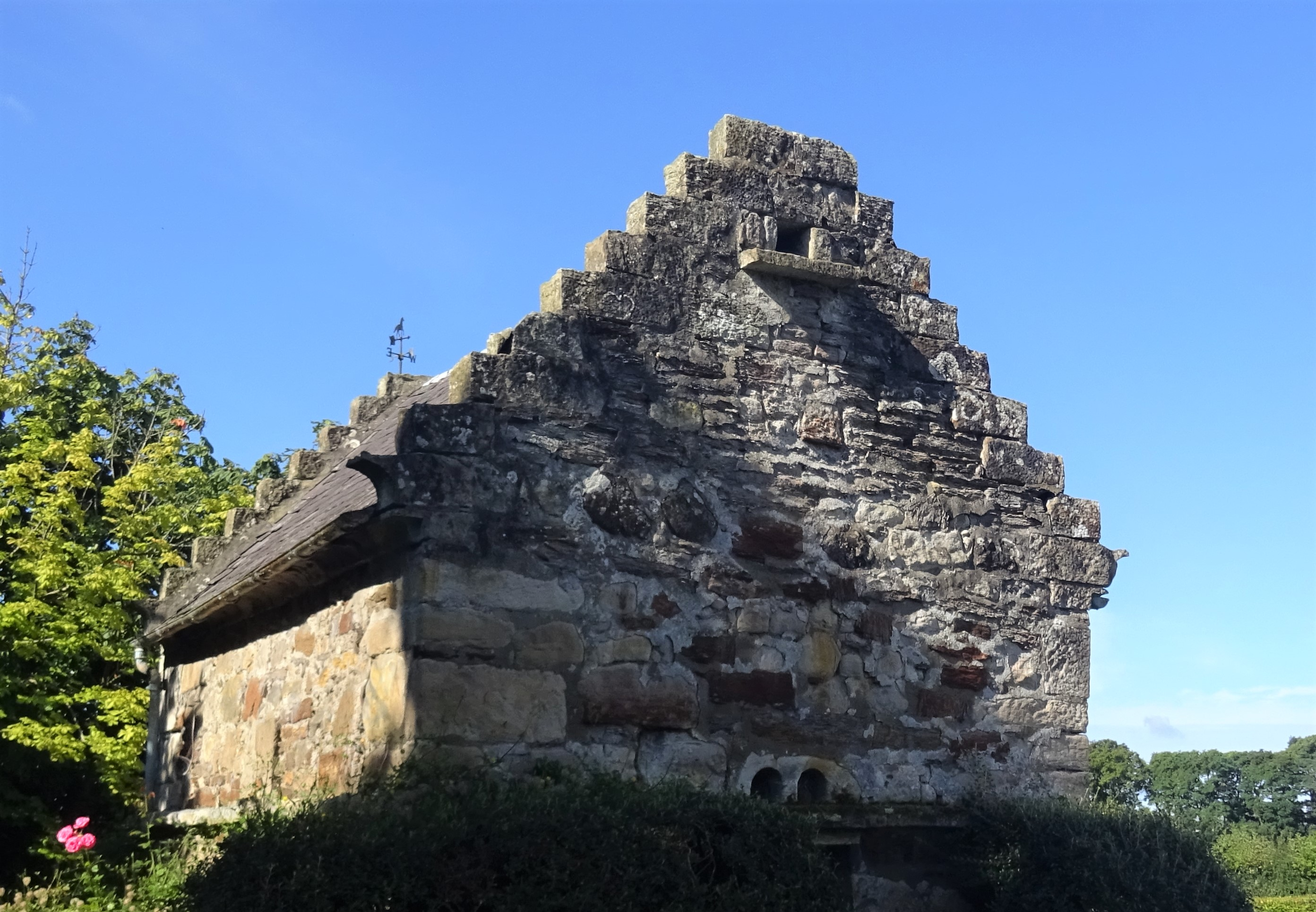
The old girnal, converted into a doocot

Each prebend or secular canon was endowed through a grant of the founder's land and they were appointed by the founder or his descendants. The college rules were stipulated in a founding charter for the conduct of the services with the style of the masses tailor made to meet the spiritual needs of the founder and their descendants. The charter also determined the personal and professional lives of the clergy, such as permanent personal residence at the college.

In the mid-16th century Presbyterian reformers disavowed the existence of purgatory and therefore the practice for continual prayers for souls trapped there ceased to be permitted as did prayers for the success and immortality of their family lines.

The Cunningham family were required to cease to use their buildings for these 'Popish' and idolatrous practices, the 5th earl taking secular control of the college and lands. Kilmaurs Collegiate Church remained as the parish church, but the associated buildings were put to other uses, such as the Grade A Listed building that became a doocot which carries a carved head and may have once been the girnal or grain store of the college.

A painting from the 1920s shows the 'Tour' in apparently fairly good condition. Demolished in the 1960s, it was square or slightly rectangular, a sandstone construction with a paler sandstone cornice. The west facing wall of this possibly three storey building had no apparent windows; however, the south facing wall had at least two openings, one of which may have been the entry door. It has some resemblance to the Abbot's Tower at Mauchline and may have been the administrative centre for the monks of Kelso Abbey. It may have provided accommodation and other facilities. Much of the stone was used to build a garden wall.

The earls used the patronage of the collegiate church to benefit various of their dependents. In addition, they were the tacksmen of the teinds of several parishes. A tacksman was a person who leased land and collected the tithes or teinds.

Hugh Cunningham, third son of William, 4th Earl, obtained the lands of Carlung near West Kilbride that had been held by Kilmaurs Collegiate Church. An ancient chapel once stood near Overton on the Carlung lands.

The name Kirkfauld is a recent term and the previous names were 'The Tour Gardens Farm' and the 'Girnal Croft'. Circa 1855 the orchard area was still in use as an orchard.

== The Glencairn Aisle ==
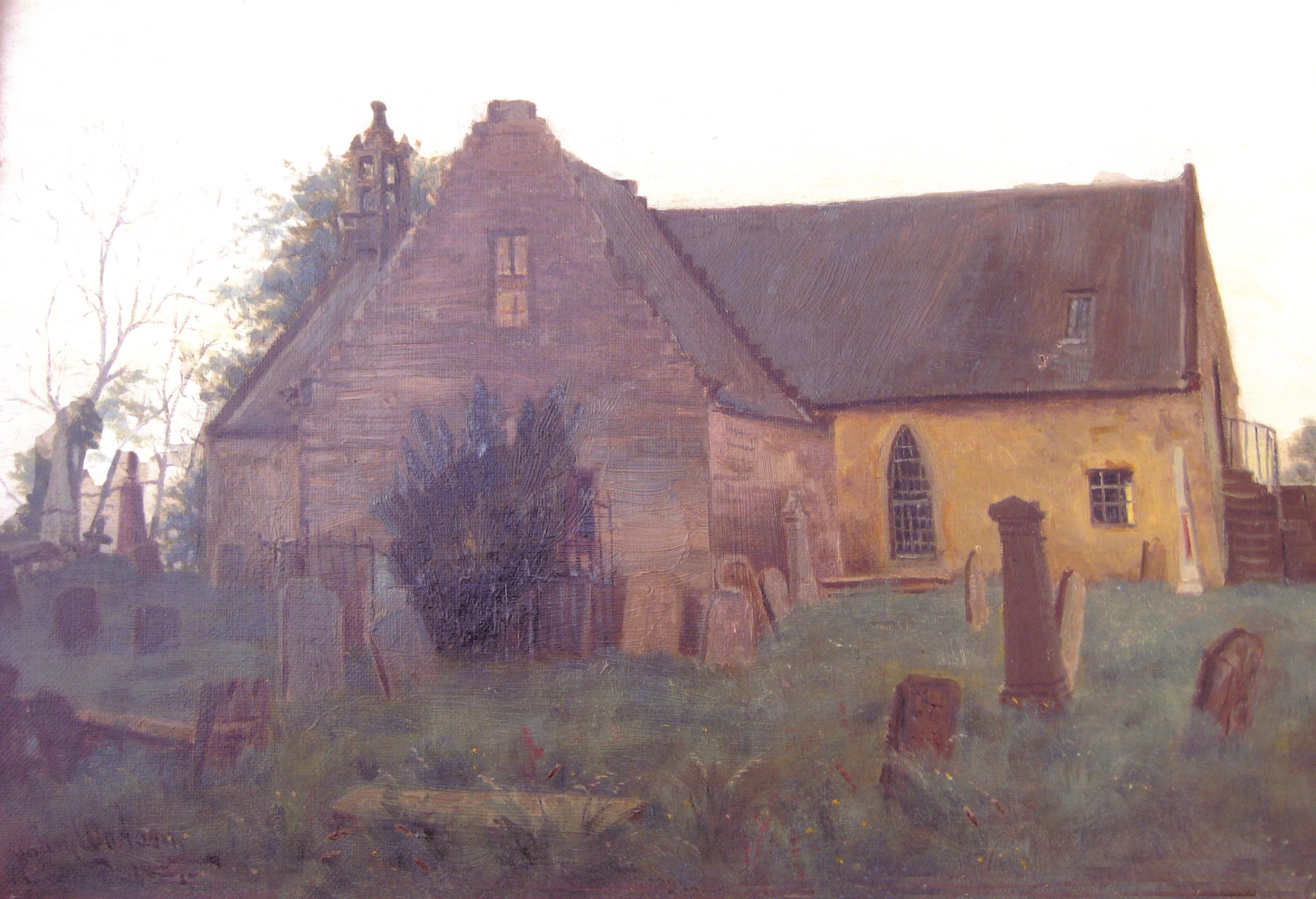
St Maurs Church and the Glencairn Aisle prior to 1888

The aisle has seen a number of substantial changes since its construction, originally said to have been the chancel of the old church. The 1515 transcript of the 1413 'Prebenderies Charter' refers to the chapel of St Maura, indicating that the aisle may have originally been the private chapel of the Cunninghams of Kilmaurs Place. Drainage works in 2024 exposed courses of stone below the present ground level that may be the remnants of an older aisle or chapel.

After the Reformation in Scotland the emphasis of worship ceased to be centred on the altar and became focussed instead on preaching. Therefore, the chancels of churches at their east ends, previously an area set aside for use by the clergy, became redundant in that the pulpit, set on a side wall with a communion table in front, was the newly required layout.

In 1633 it was agreed that the principal landowners, as heritors, in the parish would receive the teinds and would pay the minister's stipend and pay for the maintenance of the manse and church. Many chancels at this time were converted into laird's lofts. The principal heritors also often converted the chancels into family mausoleums, sometimes blocking the area off from the main church. Burial within churches had become restricted, but the old chancels were seen as areas now set apart, and as a result crypts were excavated and multiple burials took place within them.

The mural monuments at Ballantrae and Largs in Ayrshire utilised parts of old abandoned churches. Originally it was joined to the church with only a hand rail or screen separating the two. At this time the aisle effectively formed the south transept of the church, and the mural monument was once therefore considered to be within the church proper. The Roberton Aisle was located in the area that is now the main north entrance and gave the church an irregular cruciform appearance.

After the aisle ceased to be used as the chantry and later the chancel, the church session in 1838 was forced to demolish the aisle's northern gable end due to its dangerous condition. This resulted in the aisle being shortened north-south by around six feet or 1.8m, with a new gable wall being built. The fact that the aisle roof and north gable end were not integrated into the church roof may suggest that the church was built onto the older aisle or chapel rather than vice versa. Some time later the church session decided to create an external door that would allow the minister to enter the church in the pulpit area, from the space between the aisle and the church. The door was removed in 1913 when the buildings were once again joined. This may account for the cross slabs being discovered in use as the door jambs and placed in the aisle for safekeeping.

In 1888 the section of wall at the back of the pulpit was taken down and rebuilt a few feet further out, thus forming an arched alcove where the Glencairn Aisle originally opened onto the church.

The mural monument had originally stood in the middle of the east wall of the old chancel; however, these changes meant that it no longer stands in a central position. At this time the aisle had a single small barred window and a metal yett or gate to bar access via the doorway that was less than six feet high.

A few courses of the side walls had fallen or were robbed of stone after the roof collapsed, the replacement stone at restoration being still discernable. The internal walls of the aisle were once covered in plaster. A divided pediment is once said to have crowned the monument and a section may survive amongst the carved stones on display with its original finial now located on the right hand side of the monument.

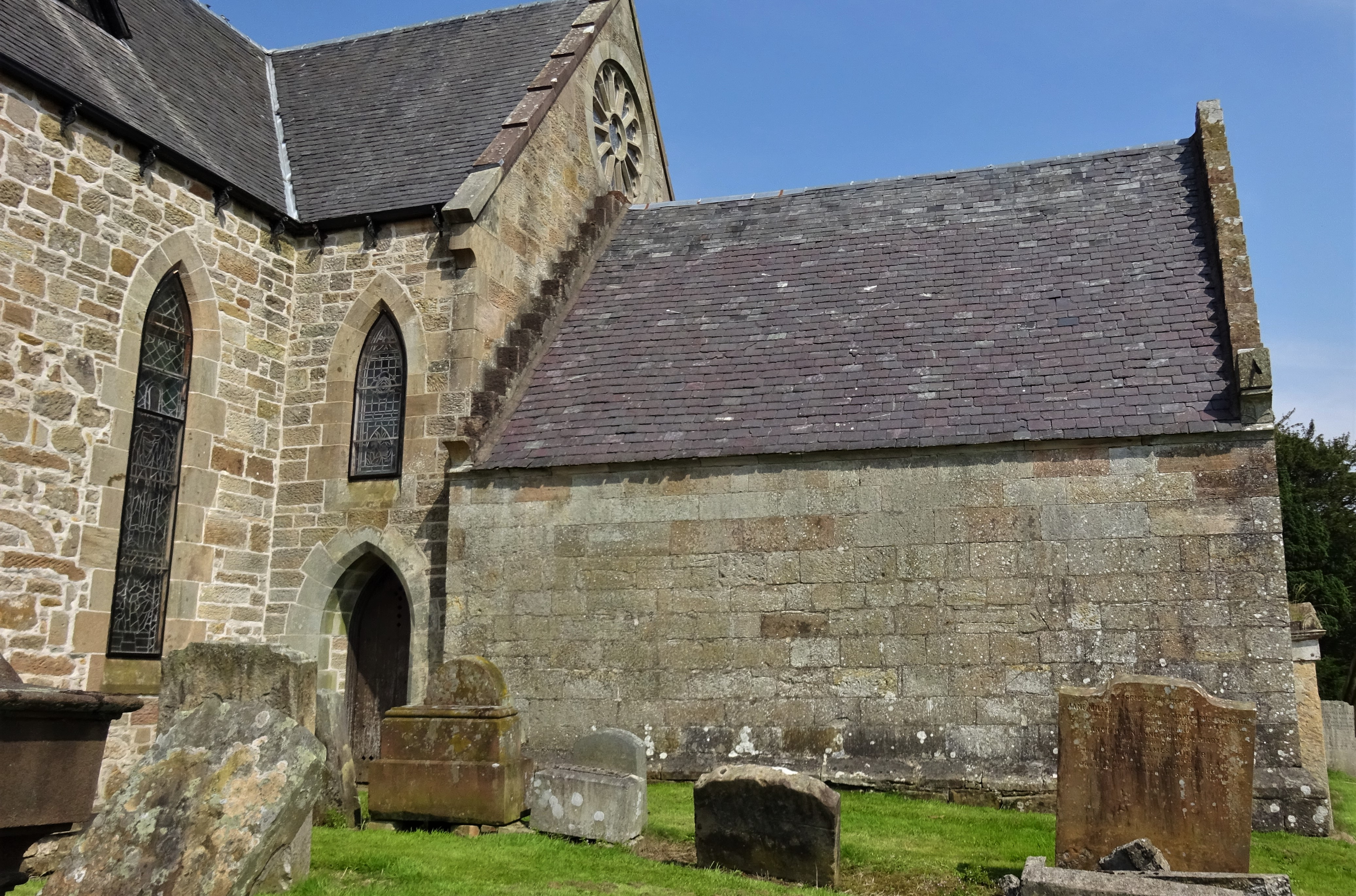
Showing the space filled in between the aisle and the church in the 1888 work on the church

The gap between the buildings is mentioned by Adamson circa 1859 and is still shown on the OS map of 1895 and even later. The church underwent extensive alterations in 1888, with a tower being added, the old belfry on the west facing gable end removed, the stone stairs on the east facing gable end likewise removed, etc. An organ was added in later years and the air intake was located in the entryway to the aisle. In 1912 a photograph shows that the aisle and the church were not at that time joined, but in 1913 an organ was installed. To accommodate the bellows the church was extended to incorporate the aisle with a new wooden door and entryway added, making the internal yett or gate redundant. Two windows in the church that faced onto the aisle were blocked up at this time.

An upper chamber known as a 'retiring room' may once have existed, once possibly reached by an internal spiral staircase as no evidence of external steps exists. The partly blocked window in the south facing gable end is indicative of a room behind. However, the roof collapsed, and upon restoration a barrel vaulted stone roof was added below the slate roof, greatly reducing the size of the chamber above and blocking the light from the upper window, which, now being redundant, was filled in except for a gap left for ventilation. The vaulted roof significantly reduced the height available for the mural monument, as can be seen by the absence of the divided pediment and the crude cutting of the back of the coat of arms panel to adjust it to the curve of the newly vaulted ceiling. New windows would have been required and the present ones may date from the 1846 works.

Cavettos bearing the plain 'Y' 'Over Fork Over' heraldic symbol of the Cunninghams are located at both ends of the crow stepped south facing gable. A sun-dial on the east facing corner of the south gable of the aisle is dated 1753, and was given to the church by William Coates, the minister from 1739 to 1778. A corbel on the previous northern gable has the inscription 'Rd 1846' in reference to the date of the replacement of the roof. The building measures 7.5m or 25 feet by 7.0m or 23 feet and is built of grey ashlar masonry.

The mullioned and transomed window have bottom lights that are blind, and thus provided just for external architectural effect; this indicates a foreign influence, as such windows were popular in England and Denmark.

The church once housed the parish school and the aisle and its monument suffered from the actions of the pupils, whilst in addition the local shoemakers removed good quality stone for use as whetstones.

In 1963 the congregations of Glencairn Church and St Maurs Church combined, and in 1966 the architects Hay Steel McFarlane drew up plans for extensions and alterations to the St Maurs-Glencairn church which included suggestions that the aisle could accommodate the church's choir or could be used as the Session House. Both plans involved opening up or connecting the aisle to the church, but nothing came of the proposals.

=== Burial crypt ===
The crypt where the Cunningham family coffins were placed lies beneath the aisle and was accessed by a stone slab with two metal rings set into it. This access is no longer visible and may be covered by the stone flag floor that exists today. The crypt is approximately eight by eight feet (2.4 by 2.4 m) and four feet (1.2 m) deep, and is roughly hewn from the soft bedrock. A slope of unhewn rock was left to allow the coffins to be slid down into the cavity. The coffins were not covered or lined with lead and therefore the wood has been exposed and rotted away almost entirely.

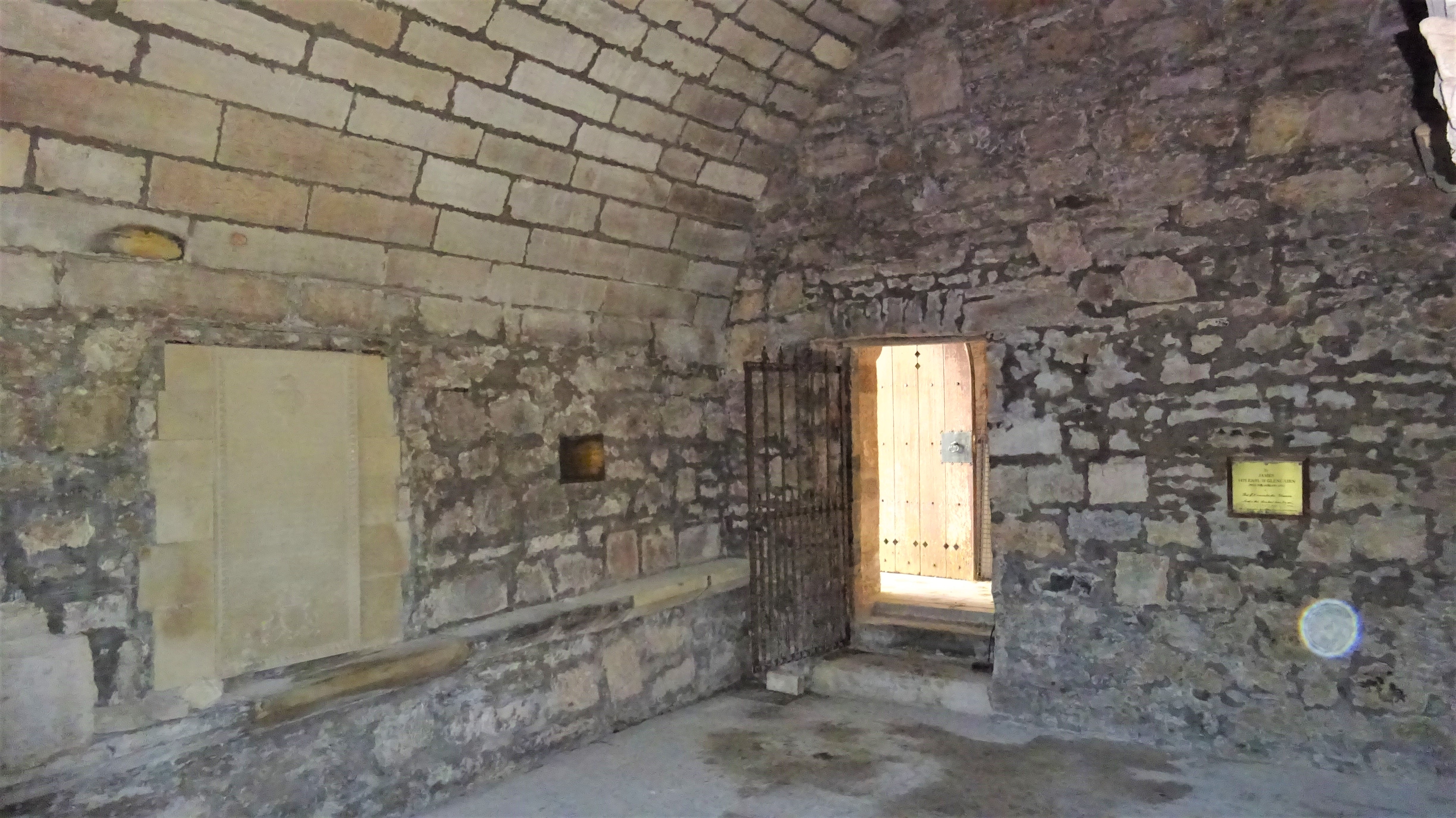
The vault inside the Glencairn Aisle

Alexander Cunningham, 5th Earl of Glencairn was buried in the Glencairn Aisle crypt. The body of 6th Earl of Glencairn and his ancestors are said to be buried in the crypt, instead of the family burial vault at Kilmacolm, with speculative evidence that a memorial of some sort existed prior to the 7th Earl's mural monument.

The last burial here, circa 1788, as reported by Johnnie Black, the parish sexton, was of a Mr. Hamilton of Bardowie who had lived at Kilmaurs Place and claimed to be a relation of the Cunninghams of Glencairn.

The large void beneath the carved images of the earl and countess has not been inspected and for practical reasons it seems unlikely to contain their coffins.

It is said that a polished red skull found in the crypt was the head of William, 9th Earl of Glencairn that was retained by his wife, Lady Margaret, out of love for her husband and this was eventually buried with her in the crypt. The rest of his body was buried with great pomp at the Kirk of St Giles in Edinburgh.

In 1842 a pair of Irish labourers, employed as navies on the construction of the new Kilmarnock railway, attended the burial of a colleague. Afterwards, finding the aisle's yett unlocked entered and using their tools, they broke into the crypt, leaving it exposed to the elements and to the ingress of rubbish, soil and masonry from the aisle and monument. The wooden coffins had rotted and the bones of the individuals were randomly scattered throughout the crypt.

When in 1870 the parish schoolmaster, Duncan McNaught, and his assistants excavated the crypt, as many as three cartloads of soil and rubbish were removed and the skulls of fifteen people were found. All the bones were collected together and placed in a new chest and the details of the excavations and repairs were sealed in a container for later generations to find and read. Dobie records that in circa 1806 twenty-one skulls or 'pows' in Scots were counted.

==== Memorial plaques ====
The Kilmaurs Glencairn Burns Club and the World Federation placed a brass plaque on the north wall that commemorates James Cunningham, 14th Earl of Glencairn, the friend and patron of Robert Burns. He was buried in Falmouth. A brass plaque on the west facing wall commemorates Fairlie Cuninghame (1883 – 1971). It makes mention of her parents Herbert and Charlotte and that she was the grand-daughter of Hastings Cuninghame. These individuals were of the Robertland cadet branch, the Fairlie-Cuninghame baronets. A decorative white carved stone plaque on the west facing wall commemorates Captain Alfred Keith Smith Cuninghame of Caprington who was killed in 1917. Sir Thomas Montgomery Cuninghame of Corsehill is commemorated by a brass plaque on the west facing wall; he died on 30 August 1870. His wife, Dame Charlotte Montgomery Cuninghame, is also recorded on the plaque. Thomas Cuninghame also has a marble commemorative plaque in St Columba's Kirk, Stewarton.

John Conyngham of Cambuskeith, a son of the 7th earl, died in March 1628 and was buried in the crypt. His name is engraved on an angled slab below his carved image in lettering that may be from the 1870 restoration.

=== The 7th Earl's family monument ===
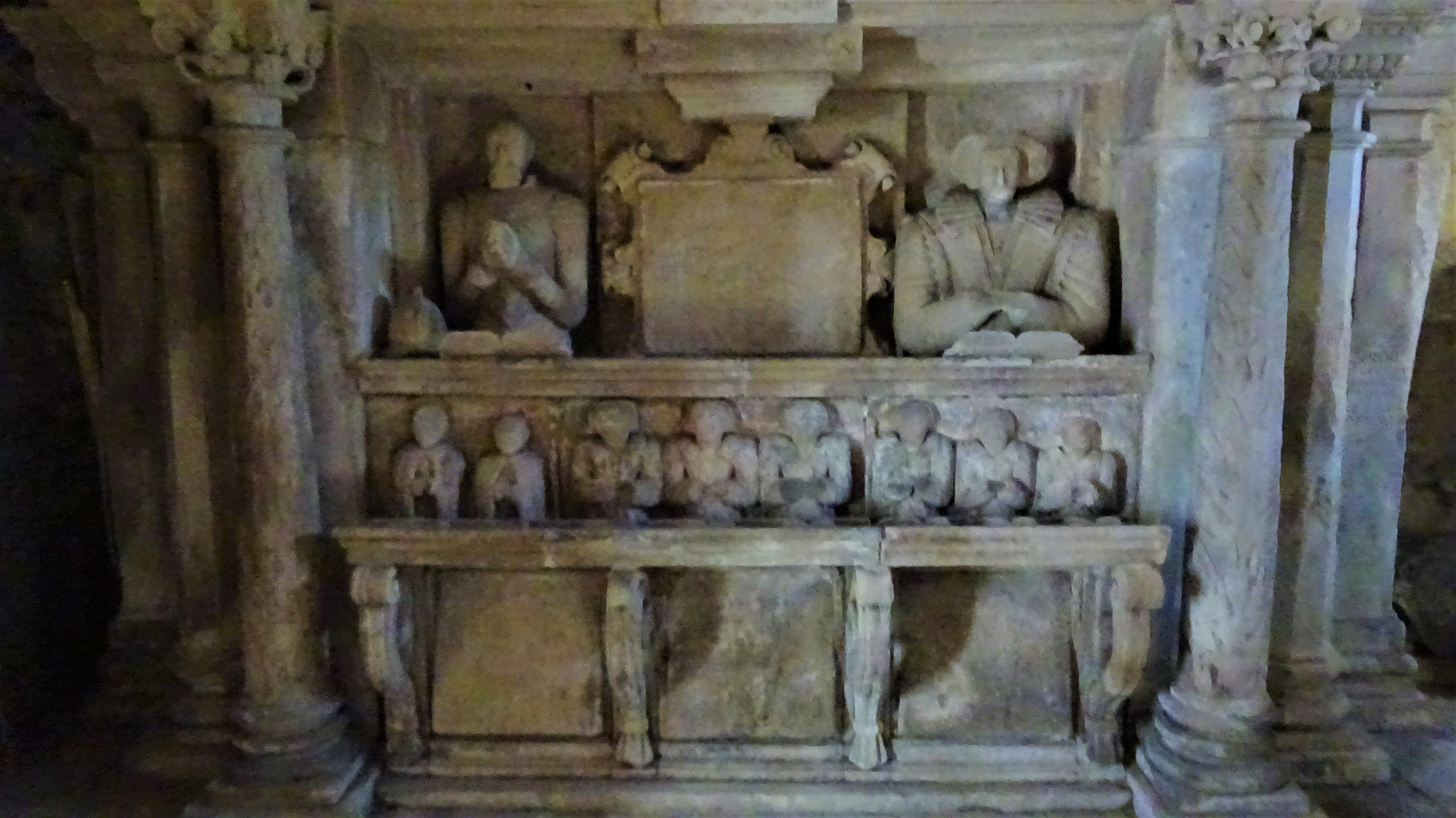
The mural monument to the 7th Earl and his family

James Cunningham first married Mariot or Margaret, second daughter of Sir Colin Campbell of Glenurchy and Katherine Ruthven. They had at least two sons and six daughters. He married a second time after Margaret's death in 1610 to Agnes, a sister of James Hay of Fingask, and the widow of George Preston of that Ilk and Craigmillar (died 1609), but had no issue.

The earl died in 1630 and is shown in head and torso, wearing full armour with his morion helmet lying to his right. A morion is a type of open helmet used by a soldier fighting on foot. These helmets were somwtimes ornately decorated, emphasising the importance of the wearer. The countess is shown in the same upright position with tartan plaid over her shoulders. The children recorded in alto-relief sculpture are Wiliam Coningham (Master of Glencairn) (VC), John (IC), Jean (JC), Katherine/Catherine (KC), Margaret (MC), Susanna/Susan (SC), Ann/Agnes (AC), and Mary/Marie (MC). The term 'Master' was usually applied to the eldest son, who would eventually inherit the earldom. The two sons are clearly identified as they are attired in male style clothing and have masculine hair styles. The six sisters' gender is likewise shown by their clothing, etc. The age of the children appear to be registered through the height of their sculptures. The children appear to be in divided cubicles with the two males together in one. Only the two males have their initials carved in relief inside a short band as well as being indicated above with comparatively crude incised initials that are above the other children as well. These initials are relatively well carved and have the appearance of not having been newly carved in 1870 during the restoration.

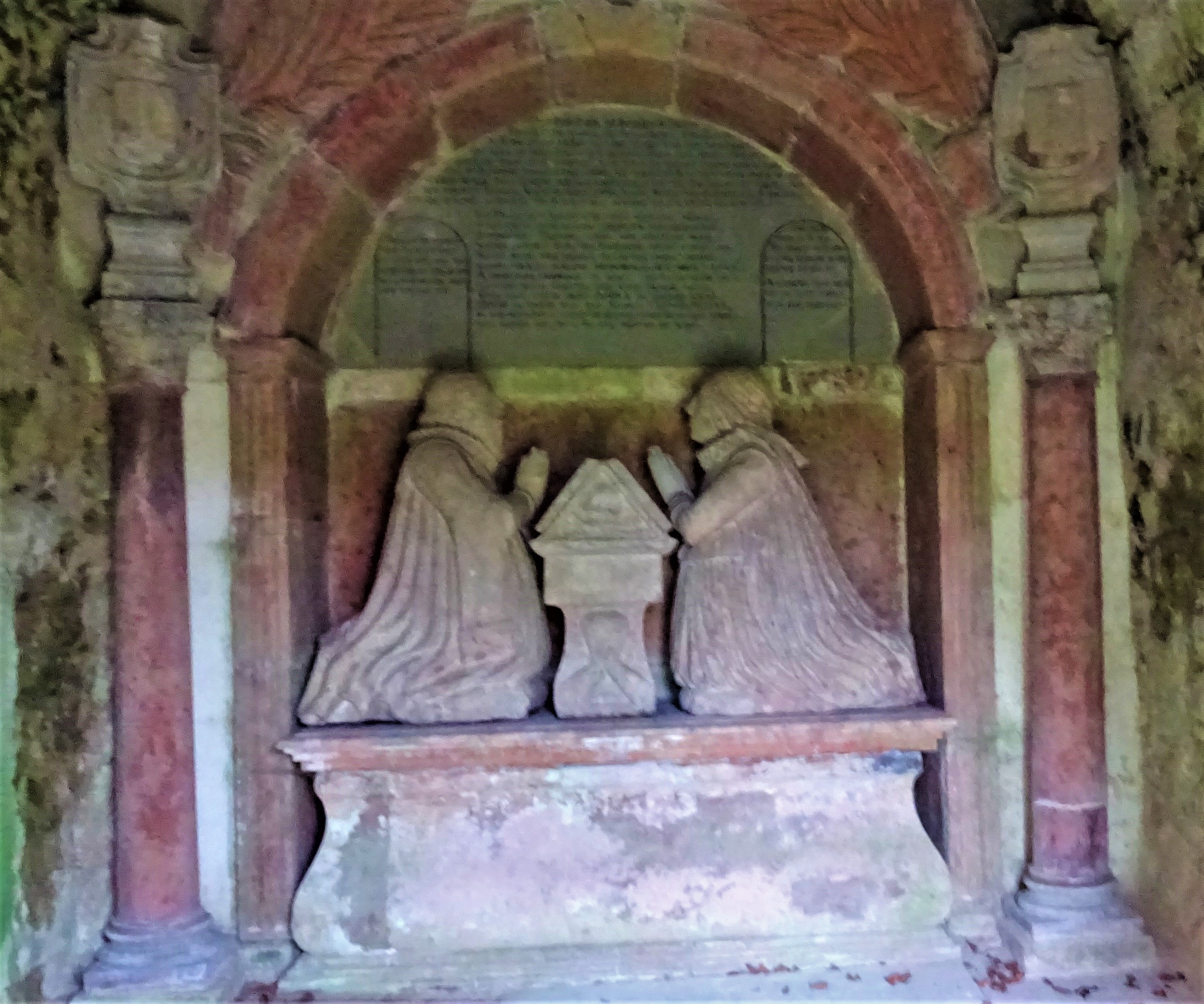
The Hamilton Mausoleum of 1641, Dunlop Churchyard

Beneath the male statues is a panel that reads "Wiliame Coninghame maister of Glencairn. Jhone Cunninghame". The reason for the spelling of their surname being different is not clear.

Figures praying and in mourning are known as 'weepers' and those portrayed were usually the children, other close relations or friends.

The children's statues seem to retain signs of once being painted in bright colours such as exist at the 1641 Hamilton Mausoleum, which was once so brightly coloured that it was locally known as the 'Picture House'. The Bargany or Kennedy Aisle monument at Ballantrae was also once brightly painted and gilded.

The intention of the monument's architect appears to have been to show the earl, countess and their children in the 'Laird's Loft' in the kirk actively at worship.

The coat of arms panel atop the monument carries the Cunningham 'Y' fork to the left and the Campbell symbols to the right. The initials 'MC' are on the right and an 'E' with 'IC' for James Cunningham on the left with at the 'D' for 'Dame' Margaret at the bottom. The pair of coneys (rabbits) are the supporters and either side are carvings of a bird which may represent peregrine falcons, possibly as a reference to a popular sport of the aristocracy, falconry.

Metal rosettes or initials may have once been located in two or more of the small empty squares that are located on the frieze and on the base of one finial. The squares on the frieze and finial show signs of the plaques being forcibly prised off (See Wikimedia Commons link). An ornate intertwined monogram with 'I, M & C' may be for the earl and countess as 'James and Margaret Cunningham'. It is clearly visible in a square on the left hand side above a column capital and the condition suggests that it was re-carved in the 1870 restoration. The reading of the 'I' as a 'J' is because of the lack of a 'J' in the Latin alphabet. A now mainly unreadable panel beneath the daughters recorded their names and some details of their marriages. The spelling of the surname is not consistent:

"Heir . lyes . Maistres . Jean Cuninghame contracted with the Earl of Cassls Decesit in her Virginitie The 23 . of . December 15 . 7 and Maistres . Catherine Coninghame"

"Lady Glengarnock Maistres Margaret Conynghame Evandale Maistres Susana Conynghame Maistres Agnes Conynghame Maistres Mairie Conynghame."

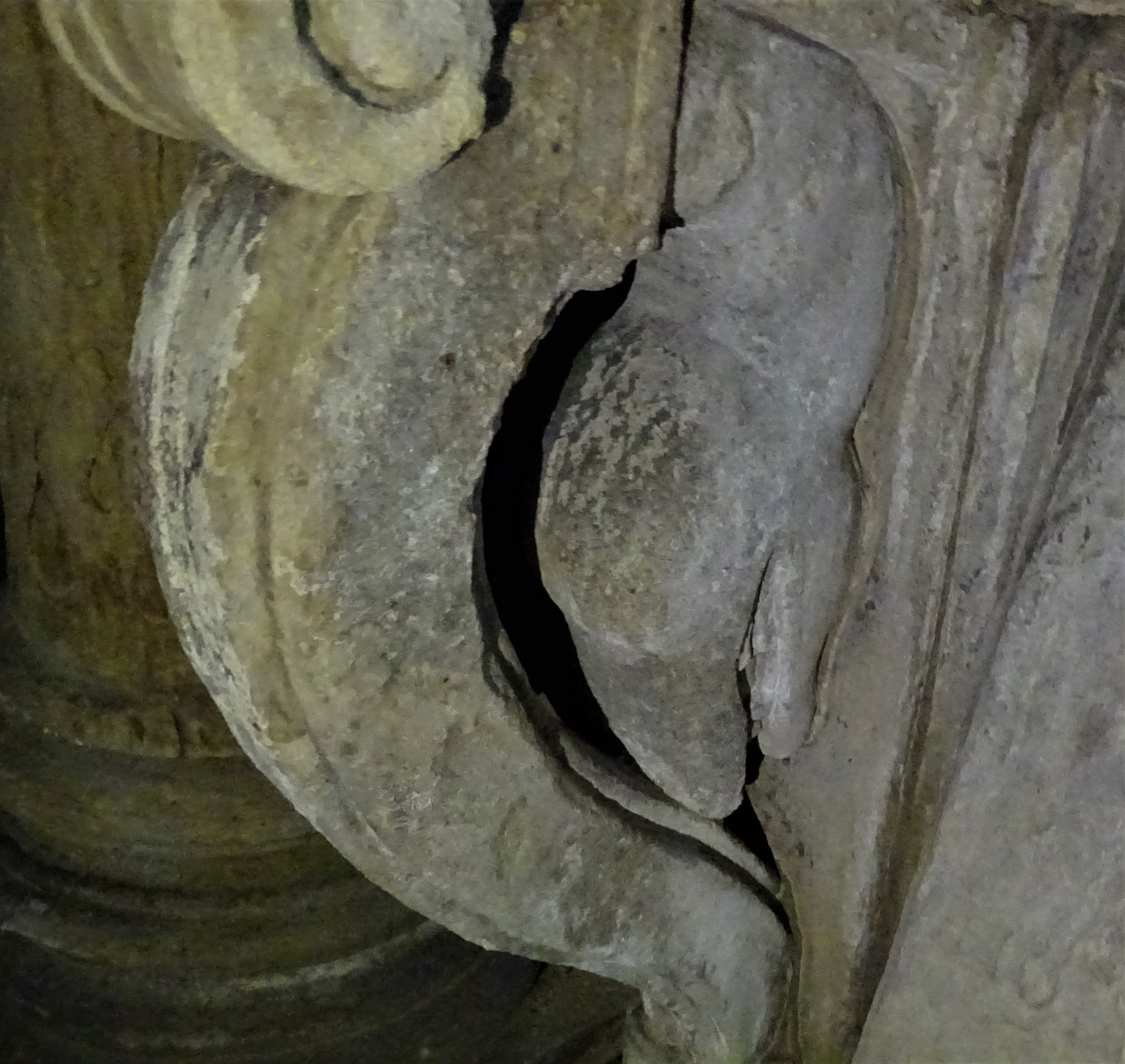
A snake biting its tail

Several panels once carried carved script, however, some are nearly or actually unreadable. The date "1600" is clear, as is the statement "Nothing surer than death, be therefore sober and watch in prayer." The bottom right panel has a record of "Maistress Agnes Coninghame" which may be a reference to the Earl's second wife, Agnes Hay.

The square panel with supporting scrolls that lies between the earl and countess had readable inscriptions in 1912, however only a few words can now be made out. It also has a miniature carving that is an echo of the dominant baluster present on the Kennedy Aisle mural monument.

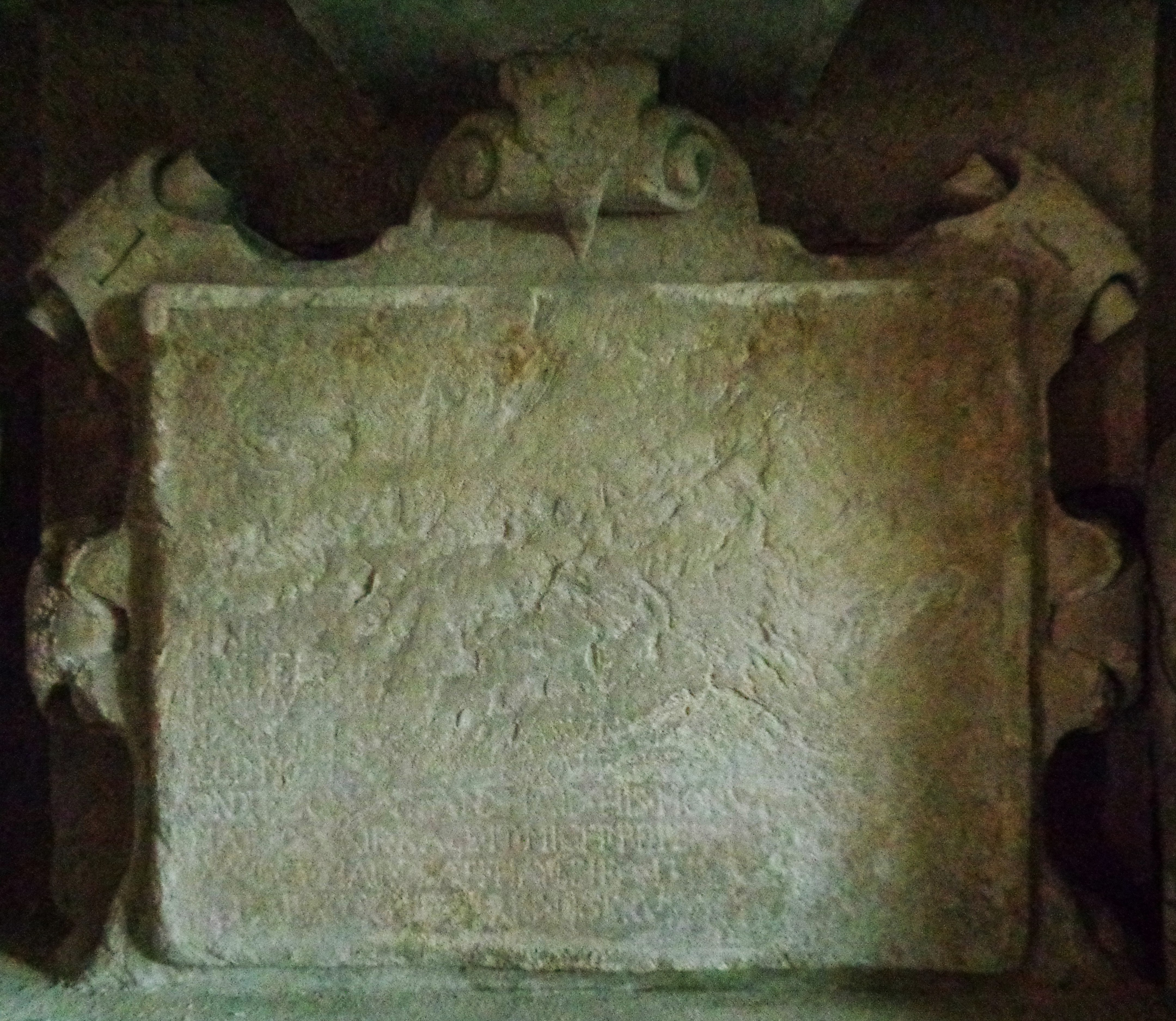
The mural monument to the 7th Earl and his family

Two of the four supports of the stall bible rest in front of the children are snakes or serpents. Their heads are curved back to bite their tails, forming an ouroboros which symbolises rebirth and renewal as derived from the act of a snake sloughing its skin.

In keeping with Presbyterian beliefs and practices the monument does not bear any crucifixes, references by name or in carved imagery to the Virgin Mary and the Latin language, associated with Catholicism, is hardly used.

The columns and capitals being different from one another is an unusual feature. The central section of the monument echos contemporary chimney places. Sir David Cunningham of Robertland, as Master of the King's Works, may have been the architect or advisor on the Glencairn and Kennedy Aisle's designs.

The monument has survived its various negative influences surprisingly well, partly due to its construction from locally sourced fine-grained freestone.

==== Ligatures ====
Some of the carved letters on the monument have been made into ligatures where two or three letters have been conjoined. This was done by the stonemasons where space was at a premium, close to an edge where the stone might fracture or as a matter of habit. The monument has examples of the ligatures 'ME', 'NE', 'ND', 'VE','TH' and a rare three letter 'THE.' In addition, full stops were used in places to show where a word started and ended.

==== Funerary helmet ====
The earl's stone carved funerary Morion helmet lies on his bible board. Also known as 'mortuary helms' or 'mort helms', they are a major element of a suit of armour and were often placed above or near the carved memorial effigy of the knights or members of the nobility concerned, in a tradition that ran from at least the 14th through to the 17th century, particularly when the person concerned had gained a reputation in life as a warrior. These helmets were often brightly painted or otherwise ornamented with floral designs. They are largely located within rural churches and other religious buildings with only a few examples known from Scotland.

==== The conjoined armorial bearings ====
Blazon (armorial bearings) : Sinister (left) – Argent (silver) a sheaf-fork Sable (black), within a bordure (a broad border) Ermine (fur as black spots on a white ground). Dexter (right) – Quarterly 1st & 4th gyronny (divided into gyrons by straight lines all crossing at the fess point) of eight Or (gold) and Sable (black), 2nd Or (gold) a fess (broad horizontal stripe across the middle) checky (equilateral rectangles of alternate tinctures) Azure (blue) and Argent (silver), 3rd Argent a lymphad or ancient galley sails furled flags and pennants flying Gules (red) and oars in action, Sable (black) a bordure (broad border) Ermine. Above the shield is placed a helmet with vizor closed facing sinister, mantling of three pairs of Acanthus leaves (device of the painter to give prominence to the coat of arms) Argent (silver) in relief, and surmounting the achievement are placed is a central crest, (figure attached to the helmet for identification in battle) viz: – an Earl’s coronet surmounted by a unicorn; on a compartment below the shield, which is a double escroll (scroll), whereupon is inscribed the words ‘Fork Ovir’ (Fork Over), are placed two supporters (figures on each side supporting the shield), sinister a coney (rabbit) at liberty (not restrained), argent (silver), dexter a stag at liberty, maned and hoofed, Or (gold): attired with six tynes (branches on antlers) Gules (red). The coat of arms, crest and supporters on the Glencairn Monument were once brightly painted and gilded to match the description given.

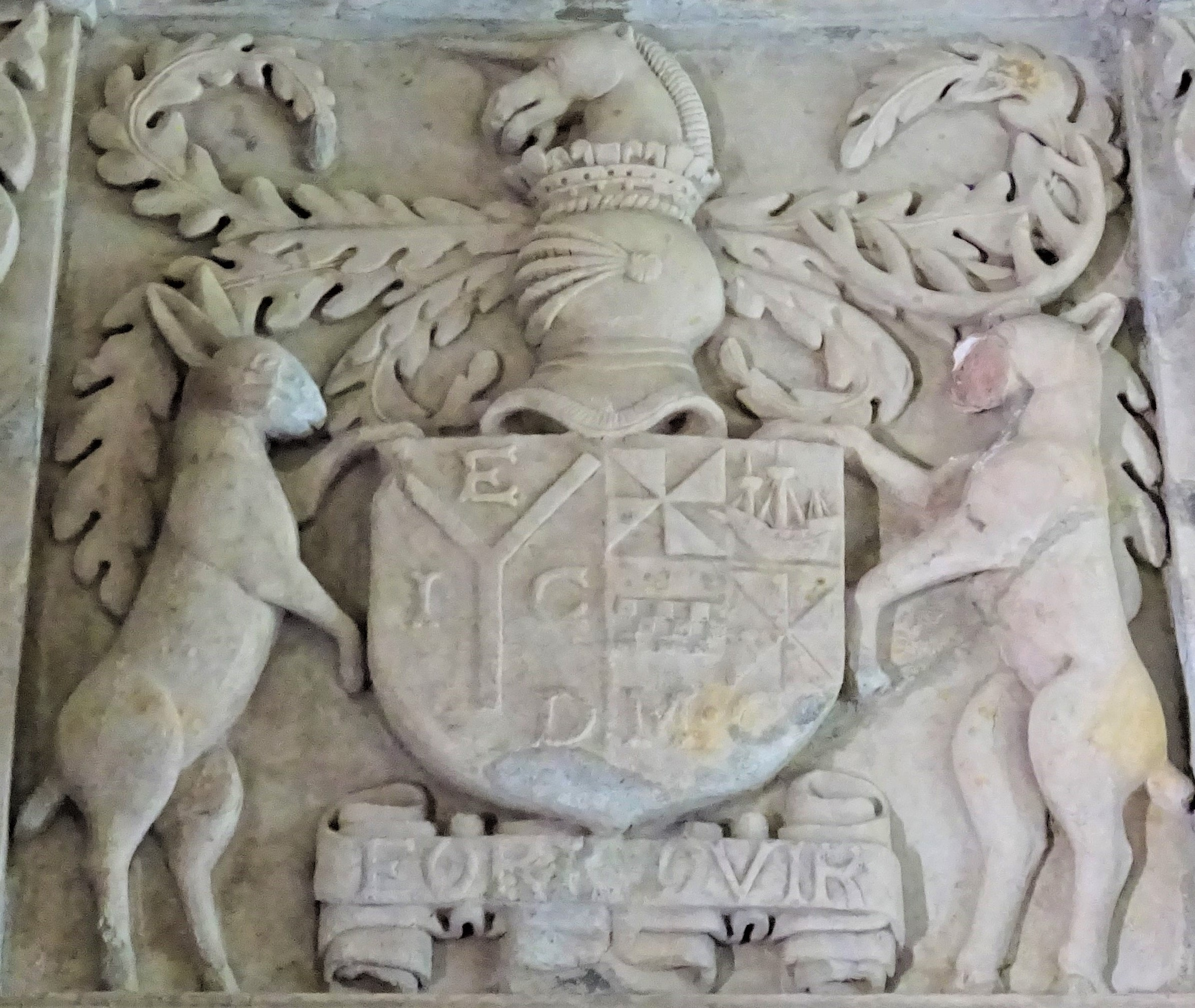
The conjoined arms of the 7th Earl and Countess of Glencairn

The Letters ‘D M C’ for Dame Margaret Campbell and ‘E I C’ for Earl James Cunningham appear on the shield, apparently as an interpretive addition. The Latin alphabet does not has a ‘J’ so an ‘I’ is used in its place. The presence of these letters is not part of normal heraldic practice on the coat of arms of individuals.

The lymphad or ancient birlinn galley on the dexter, right or Campbell side does not conform to the heraldic description and this may be a case of the stone mason being unfamiliar with the correct heraldic design as in 'sails furled flags and pennants flying Gules (red) and oars in action' with a single mast. The ship actually carved has the appearance of a galleon with 'three masts, sails furled, pennants flying,' but no oars that would be typical of a galley. Two pennants are possibly present but no flags.

==== The master mason ====
The 'Masson Bvrges' David Scougal, responsible for this monument is thought to have carved his mason's mark and his details on the right-hand side of the monument on the central of the three receding pillars, but this is not mentioned in the detailed description published in 1876. The letters show little wear and may have been re-carved during one of the restorations. The carving reads "Wroch Be David Scwgal masson bvrges in Carel." Carel stands for the town of Crail in Fife. The mason used a mixture of Renaissance motifs and medieval details, whilst the 1639 Skelmorie Aisle monument in Largs is entirely Renaissance. In 2022, during restoration works, a second and different mason's mark was found on one of the finials.

The stone used is not recorded and may be local, but it could have been supplied by the master mason. The origin of the design is likewise unknown and therefore the influences of the mason and the client cannot be ascertained. As a 'Glorious Tomb' the painting and gilding may have required a separate craftsman.

When monuments were executed by a single mason the need for mason's marks was clearly reduced and in the 16th century signed, as opposed to marked, tombs began to appear, with by the early 17th century masons’ signatures achieving acceptance or becoming fashionable. The Glencairn Monument example may be a transition phase, where an inscription and a mark identifies the mason involved. At the aisle the carved inscription is not sophisticated and monuments made after 1600, that are signed, indicate a higher level of skill and education along with elegant cursive script. The use of prominently displayed marks in this way seems to have been a short-lived phase just before signed tombs became common; however, Scougal used only a mason’s mark on the Schaw Monument at Dunfermline Abbey and possibly at the Kennedy Aisle monument at Ballantrae, which is also thought to have been his work, with a mark that may have been lost through erosion due to exposure to the elements.

==== Dame Mariot or Margaret Cunningham, Countess of Glencairn ====
Margaret is also recorded as Mariot, which may be a rendering of the Scottish Gaelic 'Mairead', the equivalent of Margaret. Sir Colin Campbell, known as Grey Colin, Margaret's father, is on record as a Protestant, but the church records for Kilmacolm suggest that Margaret was a practising Roman Catholic as she consistently failed to attend services at the Kilmacolm Presbyterian Church of Scotland and was even declared 'contumax' by the presbytery, meaning a person who is accused of a crime who refuses to appear and answer to the charge. Instead of attending the Presbyterian services she seemingly took a private mass at her home, Finlaystone Castle, with priests Patrick Walkinshaw and Luke Stirling officiating. Despite several warnings over the years she never seems to have attended Kilmacolm Church; however, her husband, James, submitted to the presbytery following complaints of non-attendance against him. In 1603 the church appointed Mr Robert Stirling, along with others, to assist the Rev. Daniel Cunningham in his efforts to force the countess to attend his church as she was accused of "continual absence and byding fra the kirk; her absence was taken to mean that she was at heart a Roman Catholic".

==== Details of the children of James and Margaret Cunningham ====
- William Cunningham, 8th Earl of Glencairn. Married Lady Janet Ker, daughter of the first Earl of Lothian. Died 1631.
- John Cunningham of Cambuskeith in Kilmarnock died in March 1628.
- Lady Ann/Agnes (died 1625), married in 1603: James Hamilton, 2nd Marquess of Hamilton.
- Lady Susanna/Susan died 1623, married in 1610: Alexander Lauder, younger of Haltoun.
- Lady Margaret died after 1622, married in 1598: Sir James Hamilton of Crawfordjohn; in 1603; Sir James Maxwell of Calderwood.
- Lady Catherine married in 1612: Sir John Cunningham of Glengarnock.
- Lady Jean died 1597. Contracted to marry the Earl of Cassillis, but he married another.
- Lady Mary/Marie married John Crawford of Kilbirnie.

The inscription on one of the plaque records the daughters names as Agnes, Susana, Margaret, Catherine, Jean and Marie and on another are recorded the sons William and John.

== Repair and restoration ==
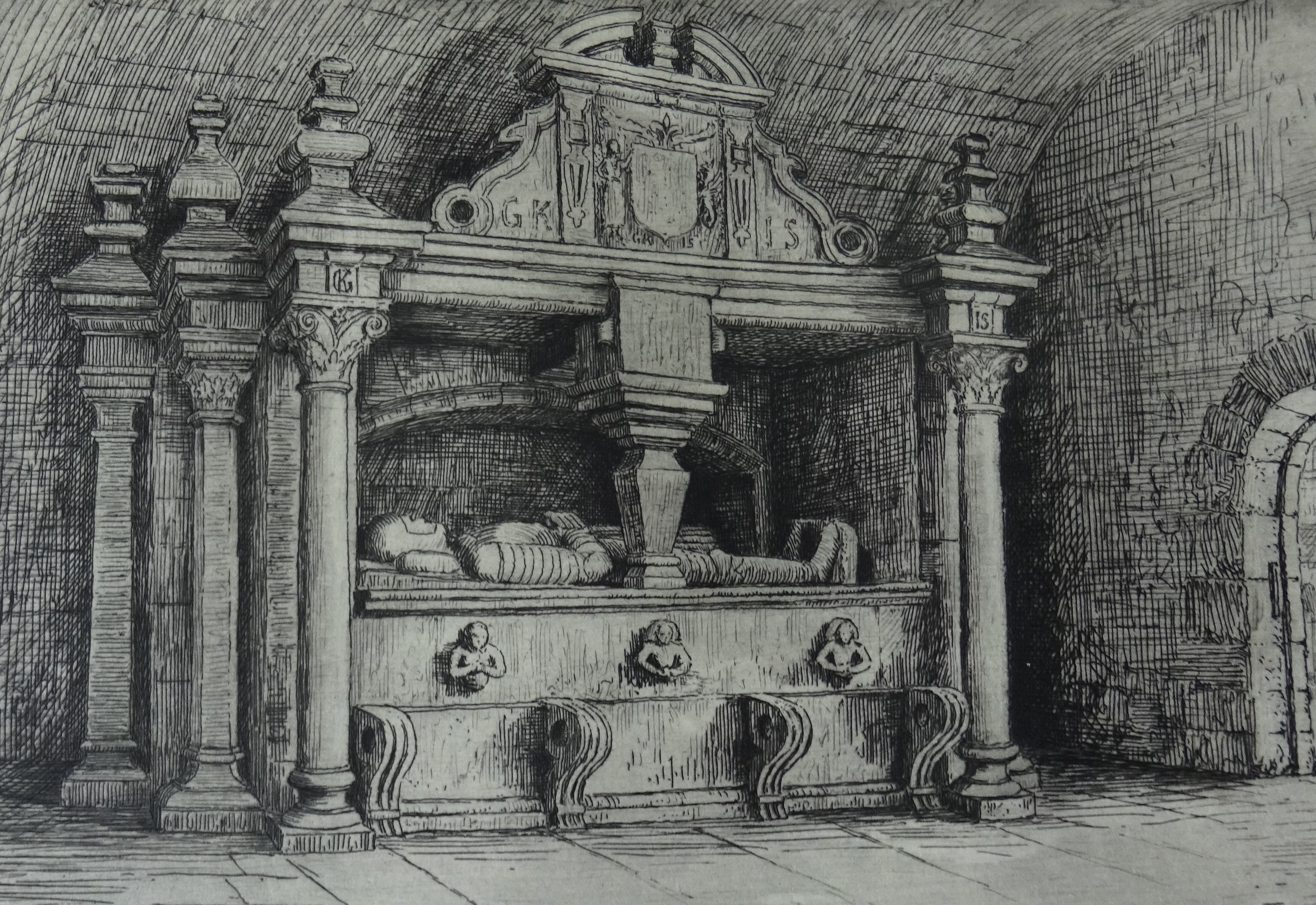
The Bargany Monument at Ballantrae

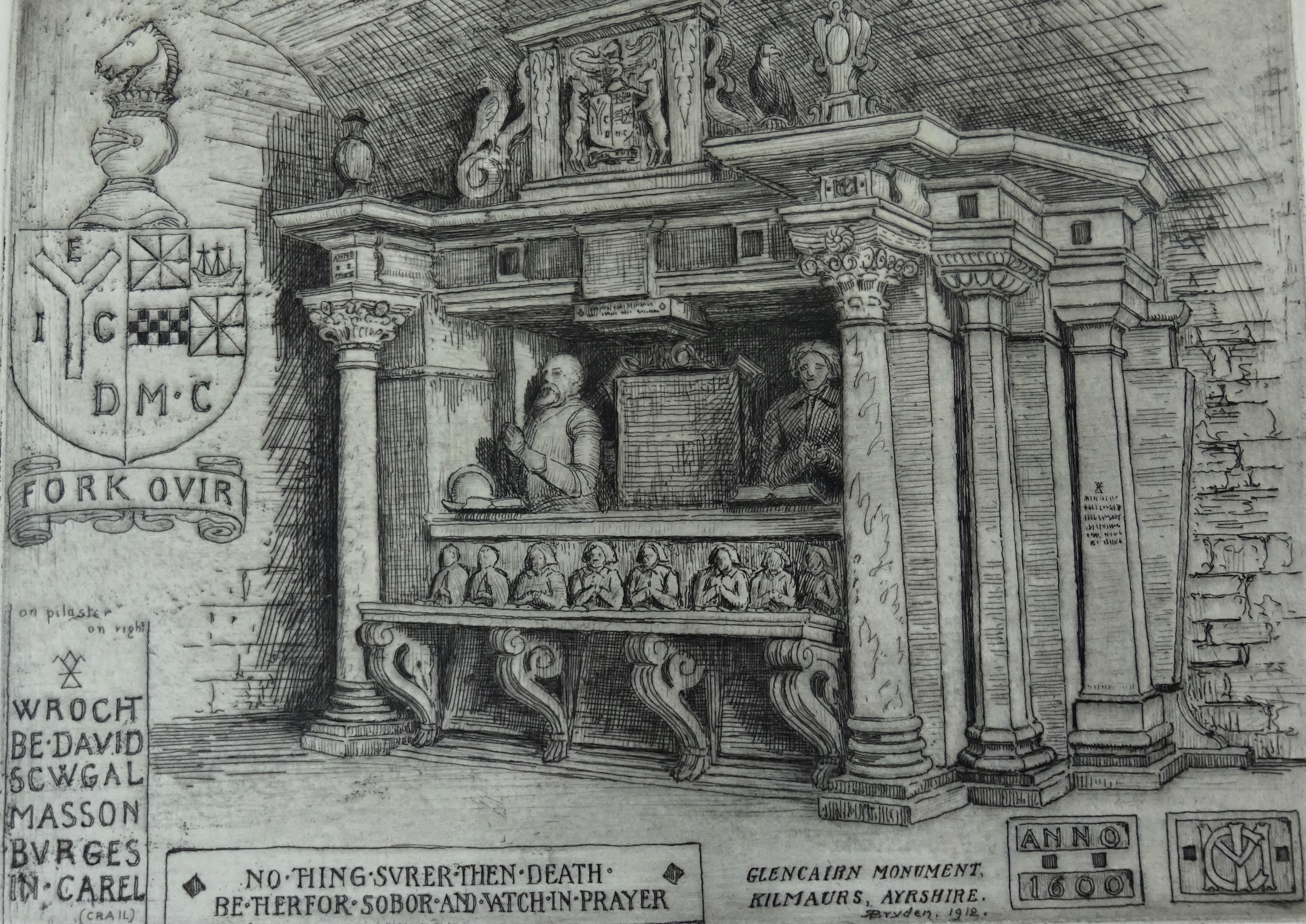
The Glencairn Monument at Kilmaurs

In 1793 the aisle was in a "shameful state of disrepair" but an appeal for funds for restoration was not successful. Some minor alterations were carried out a few years later, such as the erection of a gate to restrict access, following the visit of Lady Don of Newton, sister of John, the last Earl of Glencairn. The aforementioned roof collapse knocked off finials and the sections above the cornice as well as breaking the book boards.

In 1846 the roof was replaced and a vaulted ceiling added. The upper window lay above the new vault and it was sealed apart from an air vent. New windows were installed in the gable end to provide light. by Sir Alexander Montgomerie Cunninghame of Corsehill, but no work was carried out on the monument itself.

In 1870 Duncan McNaught, the local schoolmaster and local historian, was approached by Sir William Montgomery Cuninghame of Corsehill on behalf of his mother, with a request for assistance with the restoration of the 1600 AD monument to the 7th Earl of Glencairn, his countess and their children. The crypt beneath the aisle was first excavated with several cartloads of soil and rubbish removed and portions of the monument were recovered, reassembled and used as models for the restoration. The monument was extensively restored by a mason, Robert Boyd, an employee of Messrs. Boyd and Forrest of Stewarton, the work being carried out for Dame Charlotte Montgomery Cunninghame to celebrate the memory of her husband Sir Thomas, who died in 1870, 8th Baronet of Corsehill and a descendant of the Earls of Glencairn through Andrew, second son of the 4th Earl. A brass memorial plaque gives these details. It has been moved to the west wall of the aisle from its previous location on the blocked windows beneath the stained glass windows on the south facing gable end.

The memorial to Captain Alfred Smith Cuninghame on the west wall records that the aisle was restored in his memory in 1917 by his father Colonel Cuninghame of Caprington.

The Glencairn Aisle Trust in 1989 raised £3000 that was used to carry out external stone cleaning and the vault was re-roofed. Historic Scotland (sic) were contacted regarding restoration work on the monument but no record of works has been found.

In 2022 the Glecairn Aisle Preservation Committee and Clan Cunningham International raised £6,000 for repairs to the monument, in particular the removal of cementaceous repairs to the head of the countess and replacement of rusting iron reinforcements.

The Bargany or Kennedy Aisle at Ballantrae in South Ayrshire of 1601 appears to have used the Glencairn Aisle monument as a model and may therefore provide some clues as to the original appearance of the Glencairn Aisle monument and vice versa. It commemorates Gilbert Kennedy who was killed in 1601 in a feudal conflict by the Earl of Cassillis, aged only 25.

== Cross slabs and carved stones ==
Two medieval carved cross slabs are stored in the aisle, one with a carving of a dragon with vine leaves and both with a pair of shears representing the Greek goddess Atropos and one of the three 'fates' who ended the life of mortals by cutting their threads. She worked along with her two sisters, Clotho, who spun the thread, and Lachesis, who measured the length. The thickness and original width of these ornately carved slabs suggests that they may have been the lids of stone coffins. The founders of the Kilmaurs Collegiate Church in the 15th century, Sir William and Lady Margaret Cunningham, would have had ornate high status grave covers such as these.

Also in the aisle are two Corinthian capital pilasters, an 18th century Queen Conch shell, broken parts of the monument's finials, part of the divided pediment, and a part of a window with the Cunningham 'Y' carving. McNaught records that "At the restoration of 1888, what appeared to be side posts (jambs) and lintel of a door were uncovered in the north wall of the east aisle, and, in close proximity, a stone basin was also laid bare. The stones are elaborately ornamented with chiselled work, and when found, they had their carved faces turned inwards,.." He states that they could still be seen although the basin was built into the wall.

The pilasters were not restored due to the lack of other parts of them surviving. Two ornately carved stone fragments are similar to carvings on ornamental medieval tombs and may represent the remains of an earlier Cunningham tomb. Alexander, 5th Earl of Glencairn, was given a commission to destroy all monuments of idolatry in the West of Scotland and this may have included any family monuments in the Glencairn Aisle at that time.

== Portioners or Tenementers ==
When Kilmaurs became a burgh in 1527 the third Earl of Glencairn divided up the '£5 Lands' equally amongst 40 portioners or tenementers. They were to hold the land portioned in perpetuity. Over the centuries many of these families died out, left the village, etc. The churchyard records the following portioners :-

John Steil - d. 1721. David Templetoun - d. 1745. John Shaw - d. 1779. James Dickie - d. 1816. Bryce Girvan - d. 1838. James Miller - d. 1839. Alexander Miller - d. 1883 (son of the above).

The last person to have included a record of being a portioner or tenementer was in 1883, held continuously by descendents since 1527.

== Historical timeline ==
Dates associated with the Glencairn Aisle mainly taken from this article.

1170 – The church was granted to the monks of Kelso Abbey, for the use of the Priory of Lesmahagow. Kilmaurs church, which he referred to “His Town in Cuningham,” came with 65 acres or 26 hectares of land. Robert's grant was made on the condition that the monks would accept him into their order and when he died, he pledged to give two-thirds of his wealth to the monastery of Kelso. In exchange the Abbot of Kelso granted him the lands of Little Draffan in Lanarkshaire, along with its chapel.

This agreement was intended to ensure that his soul and that of his close family, descendents and ancestors would enter heaven. The conditions of the arrangement was validated by the Constable of Scotland, a de Morville, and also by the Bishop of Glasgow. The then rector, Hugh de la Rokelle, was permitted to keep half of the church's income until his death.

Kilmaurs church in 1245 was once again granted to Lesmahagow Priory by the then Bishop of Glasgow, however the incumbent rector, William de Conyngham, was still to be paid half of the church's income during his lifetime. The church's income was to be allocated to the Priory of Lesmahagow or the arrangements would be cancelled.

1189 – Robert, grandson of Warnebald, renewed the grant to the monks of Kelso Abbey.

1245 – Control of the church passed to the Priory of Lesmahagow, a dependency of Kelso Abbey.

1300 - Hervey Cunninghame established a new church above the site of St Maura's monastic establishment. This was enlarged by Sir William Cunninghame when the collegiate church was founded.

1413 – Sir William Cunningham endowed a collegiate church at Kilmaurs and refers in a grant to the Chapel of St Maura and to a separate parish church of Kilmaurs.

1413 - Sir William Cunningham granted lands to fund three presbyters to celebrate in the parish church for the safety of the soul of Sir William, the souls of his parents, the soul of Hervy who founded the church and for the souls of all his predecessors and successors and of all Christian people.

1484 – The Cunningham Earls of Glencairn officially moved their caput or family seat to Finlaystone House.

1505 - The Girnal Croft lands passed from the Abbot of Kelso to William Conynghame of Craganis (Craigends) and Mariotte Hauchynlek (Marion Auchinleck), his wife, for an annual payment of 6 shillings and eight pence.

1515 - Sir Peter Cunynghame and Sir Peter Knoks are recorded as perpetual chaplains of the church of Kilmaurs.

1532 - The Adams of Tour title deeds date from this year as a grant from the Abbot of Kelso.

1560 & 1567 – Scottish Parliament abolished and outlawed the Catholic Mass. Collegiate churches ceased to exist. The 5th Earl of Glencairn is recorded to have seized the aisle at the Reformation.

1567-69 - Archibald Crawford - First Protestant Minister.

1567-71 - John Howie installed as the first Protestant Reader, appointed to read the Scriptures and set prayers in the absence of an ordained minister. Previously Howie was a vicar, chaplain and notary closely associated with the Earl of Glencairn and his family.

1568-71 - Gavin Naismith - First Protestant Exhorter - a lay speaker, certified to hold meetings, lead prayers, and evangelise. Previously a monk at Kilwinning Abbey.

1574 - Alexander Cunningham, 5th Earl of Glencairn was buried in the Glencairn Aisle crypt.

1597 – Lady Jean Cunningham died and may have been interred in the crypt.

1600 – James Cunningham, 7th Earl, commissioned the memorial monument in the old chancel at St Maurs Kirk.

1610 – Margaret Cunningham, Countess of Glencairn died in January of this year.

1628 – John Cunningham of Cambuskeith died in March 1628.

1630 – James Cunningham, 7th Earl of Glencairn died and was buried in the Glencairn Aisle with his first wife.

1661 - Last reference to the earl as Lord Superior or Patron of the church.

1753 – William Coats, the minister, added a sundial that now sits above the cavetto on the west facing crow steps of the south gable end.

1786 – James, 14th Earl, broke the connection of the Cunningham family with the area by selling the Barony and Estate of Kilmaurs to the Marchioness of Titchfield.

1787 – The Rev. Alexander Miller was presented to the Kilmaurs congregation as its minister by Lord Eglinton. He featured in Robert Burns's 'The Holy Fair' poem.

1788 – Mr Hamilton of Bardowie, a descendant of the Cunninghams, died at Kilmaurs Place and is the last known burial in the crypt.

1791 - James Cunningham, 14th Earl of Glencairn died and although buried in Falmouth a requiem service was held in Ayrshire. The church and aisle at the time were connected and may have been the venue for the service.

1793 – the aisle was in a "shameful state of disrepair"; however, an appeal for funds for restoration was not successful.

1800 – Lady Henrieta Don of Newton, sister of the 14th and 15th Earls, and her daughter visited and some minor alterations were carried out shortly after, such as the erection of a lockable gate or door.

1838 – after the aisle ceased to be used for burials the Church Session was forced to demolish the aisle's north gable end that was in a dangerous condition, resulting in the aisle becoming a free standing structure, shortened north-south by around six feet or 1.8m, with a new gable wall being built.

1840 (circa) – the roof collapsed and knocked off finials, sections above the cornice, broke the book boards, etc.

1842 – a pair of Irish navies working on the construction of the Kilmarnock railway attended a burial and afterwards entered the aisle and using their tools, broke into the crypt, leaving it exposed to the elements, so that rubbish, soil and masonry from the aisle and monument filled the crypt.

1846 – the roof was replaced and a vaulted ceiling added as a memorial to Sir Alexander Montgomery Cuninghame of Corsehill. No work was carried out on the monument. The now useless upper window was blocked, apart from an air vent.

1870 – Dr Duncan McNaught, the local schoolmaster, was approached to assist with the restoration of the monument as a memorial to Sir Thomas Montgomery Cuninghame of Corsehill. The crypt was excavated with several cartloads of soil and rubbish removed and portions of the monument recovered, reassembled and used as models for the restoration. The monument was extensively restored by a mason, Robert Boyd of Messrs. Boyd and Forrest of Stewarton.

1913 – the aisle was once again joined to the church when an organ and associated bellows were installed. The entry way and wooden door were added as part of these alterations. The minister's door behind the pulpit was removed.

1917 – Colonel Cuninghame of Caprington "restored the aisle" as a memorial to his son Captain Alfred Cuninghame.

1960s - the 'Tour' of the collegiate college was demolished.

1971 – Fairlie Cuninghame of Robertland's ashes ceremonially placed in the aisle behind the memorial plaque.

1989 – the Glencairn Aisle Trust raised £3000 to carry out external stone cleaning and vault was re-roofed.

2019 – the stained glass windows were replaced. A project funded by the Clan Cunningham International and the Cunninghams of Caprington Castle. Local stained-glass artist, Susan Bradbury, carried out the work.

2021 – Clan Cunningham International and local supporters formed the Glencairn Aisle Preservation Committee with a remit to attempt to raise the funds required to restore and preserve the monument.

2022 – In 2022 the Glencairn Aisle Preservation Committee and Clan Cunningham International raised £6,000 for repairs to the monument, in particular the removal of cementaceous repairs to the head of the countess and replacement of rusting iron reinforcements.

2023 - The Cunningham Clan Chief, Sir John Montgomery Cuninghame visited the aisle accompanied by William Cuninghame Esq. of Caprington Castle.
