= Bill Cunningham =

Bill Cunningham may refer to:

== People ==
- Bill Cunningham (rugby union, born 1874) (1874–1927), New Zealand rugby union player
- Bill Cunningham (rugby union, born 1900), Ireland and British Lions international rugby union player
- Bill Cunningham (footballer), Irish international footballer active in the 1890s
- Bill Cunningham (infielder) (1886–1946), professional baseball infielder
- Bill Cunningham (outfielder) (1894–1953), professional baseball outfielder
- Bill Cunningham (sportswriter) (1896–1960), American journalist, sportswriter for the Boston Herald, college football player and coach
- Bill Cunningham (cricketer) (1900–1984), New Zealand cricketer
- Bill Cunningham (Canadian photographer) (1909–1993)
- Bill Cunningham (American photographer) (1929–2016), The New York Times
- Bill Cunningham (journalist) (1932–2024), Canadian television journalist
- Bill Cunningham (judge) (born 1944), author and associate justice of the Kentucky Supreme Court
- Bill Cunningham (talk show host) (born 1947), American radio and television talk show host
- Bill Cunningham (musician) (born 1950), American bassist with Box Tops

== Characters ==
- Bill Cunningham (Home and Away), in the Australian soap opera Home and Away
- Bill Cunningham (The Adventure Series), in The Adventure Series children's novels by Enid Blyton

== See also ==
- Billy Cunningham (born 1943), American professional basketball player and coach nicknamed the Kangaroo Kid
- William Cunningham (disambiguation)
- Willie Cunningham (disambiguation)
