= William John Cunningham =

William John Cunningham may refer to:

- Billy Cunningham (William John Cunningham, born 1943), American basketball player
- Bill Cunningham (American photographer) (William John Cunningham Jr., 1929–2016), fashion photographer for The New York Times

== See also ==
- William J. Cunningham (disambiguation)
- William Cunningham (disambiguation)
