= Willie Cunningham =

Willie Cunningham may refer to:

- Willie Cunningham (footballer, born 1925) (1925–2000), Scottish footballer
- Willie Cunningham (footballer, born 1938), Scottish footballer
- Willie Cunningham (Northern Irish footballer) (1930–2007), Northern Irish footballer

== See also ==
- William Cunningham (disambiguation)
