= William J. Cunningham =

William J. Cunningham may refer to:

- Billy Cunningham (William John Cunningham, born 1943), American basketball player
- Bill Cunningham (American photographer) (William John Cunningham Jr., 1929–2016), fashion photographer for The New York Times
- William J. Cunningham (Illinois politician), member of the Illinois House of Representatives
- William J. Cunningham (Texas politician), Texas state senator, see Texas Senate, District 28

== See also ==
- William Cunningham (disambiguation)
