= Decreet of Ranking of 1606 =

The Decreet of Ranking of 5 March 1606 determined the relative precedence of members of the peerage of Scotland.

== Background ==
The increasing number of disputes between peers as to the order in which they ranked and voted in Parliament and in councils caused King James VI and his Privy Council to appoint Lords Commissioners to determine each peer's rank and place. The peers or their representatives were invited to provide evidence to support their claims. The resultant "decreet" was registered in the books of the Privy Council and passed to the Lord Clerk Register and the Lord Lyon, to be used to determine precedence on all future occasions. Peers who felt themselves disadvantaged had the right to present new evidence before the Lords of Council and Session for a "reduction" to the Decreet of Ranking, but were otherwise bound by it.

== List of the peers of Scotland on 5 March 1606, by rank ==
1. Ludovic Stewart, 2nd Duke of Lennox
2. James Hamilton, 2nd Marquis of Hamilton
3. George Gordon, 1st Marquis of Huntly
4. William Douglas, 10th Earl of Angus
5. Archibald Campbell, 7th Earl of Argyll
6. David Lindsay, 11th Earl of Crawford
7. Francis Hay, 9th Earl of Erroll
8. George Keith, 5th Earl Marischal
9. Alexander Gordon, 12th Earl of Sutherland
10. John Erskine, 19th Earl of Mar
11. Andrew Leslie, 5th Earl of Rothes
12. William Douglas, 6th Earl of Morton
13. William Graham, 7th Earl of Menteith
14. Hugh Montgomerie, 5th Earl of Eglinton
15. John Graham, 3rd Earl of Montrose
16. John Kennedy, 5th Earl of Cassilis
17. George Sinclair, 5th Earl of Caithness
18. James Cunningham, 7th Earl of Glencairn
19. Mary Douglas, 6th Countess of Buchan
20. James Stewart, 3rd Earl of Moray
21. Patrick Stewart, 2nd Earl of Orkney
22. James Stewart, 2nd Earl of Atholl
23. Alexander Livingston, 1st Earl of Linlithgow
24. Alexander Home, 1st Earl of Home
25. James Drummond, 1st Earl of Perth
26. Alexander Seton, 1st Earl of Dunfermline
27. George Home, 1st Earl of Dunbar
28. John Lindsay, 8th Lord Lindsay
29. John Forbes, 8th Lord Forbes
30. Patrick Lyon, 9th Lord Glamis
31. John Fleming, 6th Lord Fleming
32. John Abernethy, 8th Lord Saltoun
33. Patrick Gray, 5th Lord Gray
34. Andrew Stuart, 3rd Lord Stuart of Ochiltree
35. Alan Cathcart, 4th Lord Cathcart
36. James Douglas, 6th Lord Carlyle
37. Robert Crichton, 8th Lord Crichton of Sanquhar
38. James Hay, 7th Lord Hay of Yester
39. Robert Sempill, 4th Lord Sempill
40. James Sinclair, 7th Lord Sinclair
41. John Maxwell, 6th Lord Herries of Terregles
42. Alexander Elphinstone, 4th Lord Elphinstone
43. John Maxwell, 9th Lord Maxwell
44. Laurence Oliphant, 5th Lord Oliphant
45. Simon Fraser, 6th Lord Lovat
46. James Ogilvy, 5th Lord Ogilvy
47. John Borthwick, 8th Lord Borthwick
48. James Ross, 6th Lord Ross
49. Thomas Boyd, 6th Lord Boyd
50. James Sandilands, 2nd Lord Torphichen
51. Claud Hamilton, 1st Lord Paisley
52. Mark Kerr, 1st Lord Newbattle
53. John Maitland, 2nd Lord Thirlestane
54. Alexander Lindsay, 1st Lord Spynie
55. Robert Ker, 1st Lord Roxburghe
56. Patrick Leslie, 1st Lord Lindores
57. Hugh Campbell, 1st Lord Campbell of Loudoun
58. Thomas Erskine, 1st Lord Erskine of Dirletoun
59. Edward Bruce, 1st Lord Bruce of Kinloss
60. James Hamilton, 1st Lord Abercorn
61. James Elphinstone, 1st Lord Balmerino
62. John Murray, 1st Lord Murray of Tullibardine
63. James Colville, 1st Lord Colville of Culross
64. David Murray, 1st Lord Scone

Robert Seton, 2nd Earl of Winton appears to have been omitted.

== Subsequent reductions to the decreet of 1606 ==
- In 1606 the Countess of Buchan (then a minor) had been ranked according to a regrant of the Earldom in 1547. In 1628, on an action of the Countess, the Earldom of Buchan was placed according to its original creation in 1469, ahead of the Earls of Eglinton, Montrose, Cassillis, Caithness and Glencairn.
- In 1606 the Earl of Glencairn did not appear, and his precedency was assigned on the earliest evidence then available, from 1503. In 1609 the original charter of 1488 was discovered and in 1610 the Earl brought a successful action which resulted in his being placed above the Earls of Eglinton, Montrose, Cassillis and Caithness. In 1617 the Earl of Eglinton had this judgement overturned on a technicality, but Glencairn's successor brought another action in 1637 and his Earldom's precedence according to the decreet of 1610 was reinstated in 1648.
