= James Cunningham, 7th Earl of Glencairn =

Scottish peer and privy councillor

James Cunningham, 7th Earl of Glencairn (1552–1630) was a Scottish peer and member of the Privy Council of Scotland.

Finlaystone House and estate in Inverclyde was the seat of the Earl of Glencairn and chief of clan Cunningham from 1405 to 1796.

== Early life ==
He was the eldest son and heir of William Cunningham, 6th Earl of Glencairn by his spouse Janet, daughter of Sir John Gordon of Lochinvar.

When Regent Morton moved against the Hamiltons in May 1579, James Cunningham, Master of Glencairn, took the Place of Paisley for the crown. Cunningham was engaged in the notorious Raid of Ruthven in 1582.

== Parliamentary appointments ==
A Privy Councillor to King James VI of Scotland, he was one of the Commissioners nominated by the Scottish Parliament, in 1604, for the projected Union with England.

== Precedency disputes ==
The disputes amongst the Scots nobility regarding precedence reached such a height in the reign of James VI that a Royal Commission was appointed by that monarch in 1606 to regulate the matter, and the different peers were invited to produce their Letters Patents, or other evidence, in support of the relative antiquity of their titles. The result was the publication of the noted Decreet of Ranking on 5 March 1606. James, Earl of Glencairn, not having requisite proof at hand, and not being lawfully summoned, did not appear on the occasion; his precedence was, in consequence, unjustly prejudiced, and he was ranked after, instead of before, the Earls of Eglinton, Montrose, Cassillis, and Caithness. Three years afterwards, on 16 June 1609, having been summoned to attend Parliament, Glencairn appeared personally before the Lords of the Privy Council, and stated that he was bringing an Action of Reduction of the said Decreet before the Lords of Council and Session, and produced the original Glencairn Patent of 28 May 1488, requesting that it should be "read in the audience of the Parliament". In the Action of Reduction he obtained a judgement in his favour dated 7 July 1610, affirming his precedence over the Earls of Eglinton and Cassillis. However, as the other two earls (Montrose and Caithness) had not been cited in the action, and as the judgement of the court placed the Earl of Eglinton after them, though entitled to precede them, that peer brought a further Action of Reduction of the said sentence and obtained a decreet in his favour dated 11 February 1617.

Not until 19 January 1648 did James's grandson, William Cunningham, 9th Earl of Glencairn bring a further action in the Court of Session and obtain a new Decreet in his favour on the point of precedence against the four earls who had claimed to rank before him; he also obtained a reduction of the Decreet obtained by the Earl of Eglinton in 1617.

== Scottish East India Company ==
On 24 May 1617, James VI authorised Cunningham, and his associates constituting the Scottish East India Company, to trade to the East Indies, the Levant, Greenland, Muscovy and all other islands in the north, north-west and north-eastern seas. Although this was in breach of the existing charters of the English East India Company, the Levant Company, and the Muscovy Company, the charter was issued under the Great Seal of Scotland, and thereby not technically an act of the English crown, which had authorised the other charters. By early 1618 the EIC and the Muscovy Company joined forces in an attempt to revoke Cunningham's charter and gained the King's assurance that he would cancel it if it proved prejudicial to them.

Eventually, it was agreed that Cunningham would receive £924, 10 shillings. James I used the situation to his advantage and extracted a loan of £20,000 from the EIC. According to the EIC's 19th century historiographer, John Bruce, Cunningham disposed of his licence for a "valuable consideration" to the EIC.

In addition to his political roles, James Cunningham's involvement in the Scottish East India Company reflects his broader ambitions in international trade. Despite resistance from established English trading companies, his efforts were significant as they highlighted Scotland's emerging interest in global commerce during the early 17th century.

== Marriage ==
James, Earl of Glencairn, married firstly, on 5 September 1574 Margaret Campbell (died January 1610), daughter of Sir Colin Campbell of Glenorchy and Katherine Ruthven. Their children included:

- William Cunningham, 8th Earl of Glencairn
- James Cunningham of Stevenstoun & Kerilaw (died after August 1612)
- John Cunningham of Kilmarnock (died after July 1627)
- Lady Ann (died 1625), who married in 1603: James Hamilton, 2nd Marquess of Hamilton
- Lady Susanna (died 1623), who married in 1610: Alexander Lauder, younger of Haltoun, and a son of the poet Marie Maitland
- Lady Margaret (died after 1622), who married in 1598: Sir James Hamilton of Evandale and Libberton; in 1610: Sir James Maxwell of Calderwood
- Lady Catherine, who married in 1612: Sir John Cunningham of Glengarnock
- Lady Jean (died 1597)
- Lady Mary, who married John Crawford of Kilbirnie

The earl married secondly, Agnes, daughter of Sir James Hay of Fingask, and widow of George Preston of that Ilk and Craigmillar (died 1609), by whom there was no issue. James built a memorial to himself and his family in the Glencairn Aisle at Kilmaurs.

Peerage of Scotland
Preceded by William Cunningham	Earl of Glencairn c.1578–1630	Succeeded by William Cunningham
