= William Cunningham, 8th Earl of Glencairn =

Scottish politician

William Cunningham, 8th Earl of Glencairn (1575–1630) was a Scottish politician.

The son of James Cunningham, 7th Earl of Glencairn by his spouse Margaret (d. January 1610), daughter of Sir Colin Campbell of Glenorchy and Katherine Ruthven. His sisters included Lady Ann Cunningham and Margaret Cunningham (autobiographer).

William succeeded his father in 1630 but enjoyed the earldom only for a short time, dying himself in October that year.

Finlaystone House and estate in Inverclyde was the seat of the Earl of Glencairn and chief of clan Cunningham from 1405 to 1796.

== Marriage and family ==
He married Janet Kerr, daughter of Mark Kerr, 1st Earl of Lothian, by his wife Margaret Maxwell, daughter of John Maxwell, Lord Herries of Terregles. They had three sons and five daughters, including:

- William Cunningham, 9th Earl of Glencairn
- Colonel Robert Cunningham, who was an usher to King Charles II
- Alexander Cunningham
- Elizabeth Cunningham, who married Sir Ludovic Stewart of Minto
- Margaret Cunningham (d. 1678), who married (1) on 31 December 1639 David Bethune, 8th of Creich, (d. 1660), and (2) John Chisholm of Cromlix
- Jean Cunningham
- Lilias Cunningham
- Marion Cunningham, who married (1) as his second wife James Ogilvy, 1st Earl of Findlater, and (2) as his second wife Alexander Fraser, Master of Saltoun, son of Alexander, 11th Lord Saltoun. Their son became William Fraser, 12th Lord Saltoun
- Anne Cunningham

Peerage of Scotland
| Preceded by James Cunningham | Earl of Glencairn; 1630 | Succeeded by William Cunningham |
