= Funerary Helmets =

Element of suit of armour placed near memorial effigies of knights or nobility

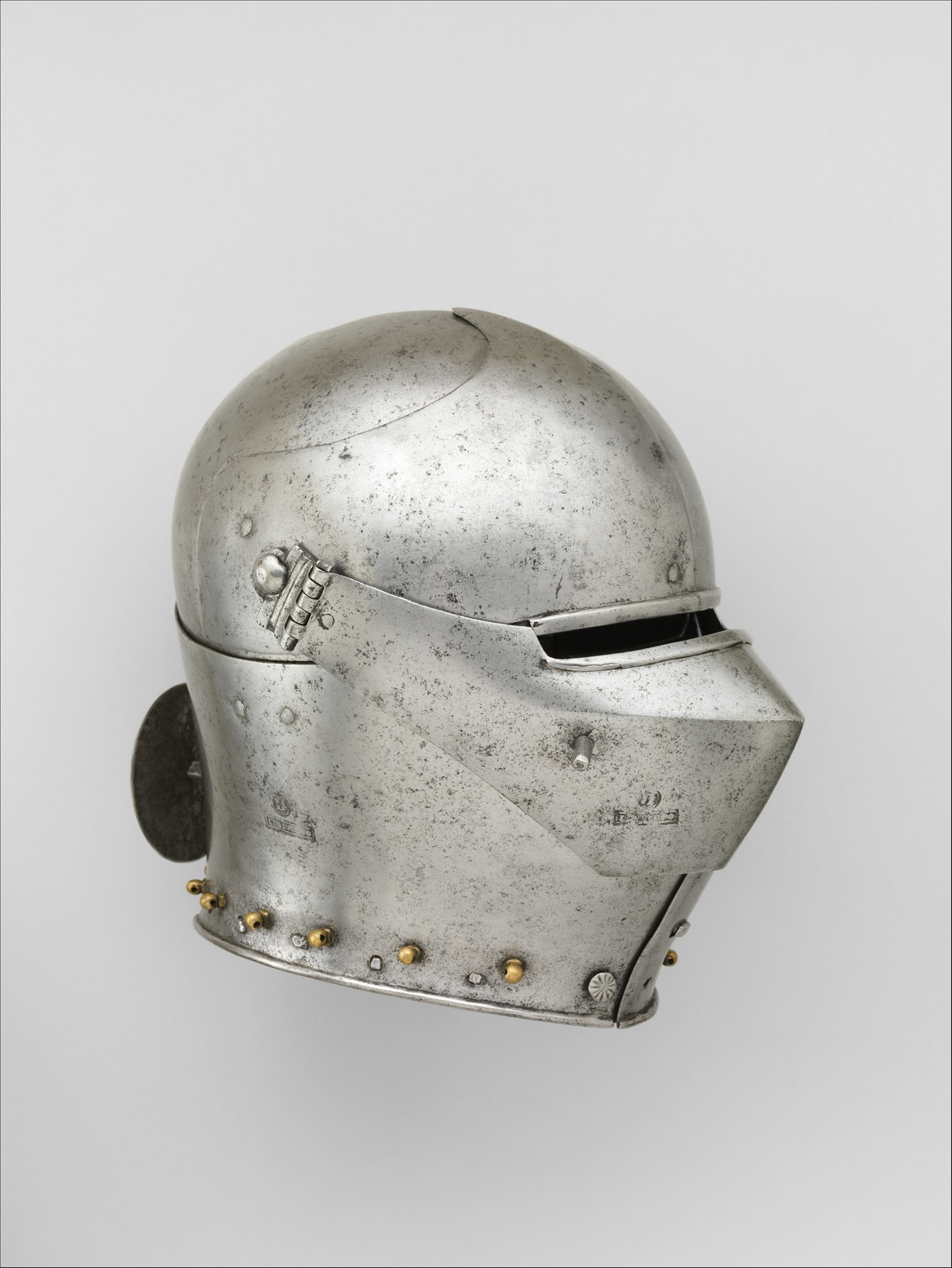
An armet helmet

Funerary Helmets, Mortuary Helms, or Mort Helms were the major element of a suit of armour that was most often placed above or near the carved memorial effigy of the knights or members of the nobility concerned in a tradition that ran from at least the 14th through to the 17th century, particularly when the person concerned had gained a reputation in life as a warrior. These helmets were often brightly painted or otherwise ornamented with floral designs, etc. Largely located within rural churches and other religious buildings, the practice was especially common in South West England and Cornwall with only a few examples known from Scotland.

Some merchants sought the right to this honour and this was granted in the late 16th century, thereby recognising that the person concerned had lived an honorable, chivalric life. This privilege resulted in a greatly increased demand for helms with the reuse and redecoration of old examples and the manufacture of new ones.

In the 17th century, it became more common for armour to accompany the funeral procession to the church rather than being permanently left on display at the funerary monument.

The tradition was not restricted to the United Kingdom and was found elsewhere in Europe.

== Ornamentation ==
It was common for funerary helmets to be richly decorated especially with floral designs that were painted in bright colours. The appropriate coats of arms might be added and in addition to reduce corrosion the inside of the helmet was often painted. Crests may have been added in some instances, as with that of Sir Robert Montgomerie as recorded below.

== Examples ==
It is likely that a number of funerary helmets have been lost or replaced due to their value as collectible items sought after by antiquarians, etc. Funerary helms might be only ornamental, but more frequently they were actual armour worn by the person during their life, either in battle or at jousts. A variety of helmets were used as shown below, such as the Armet, Bascinet, Great helm, etc.

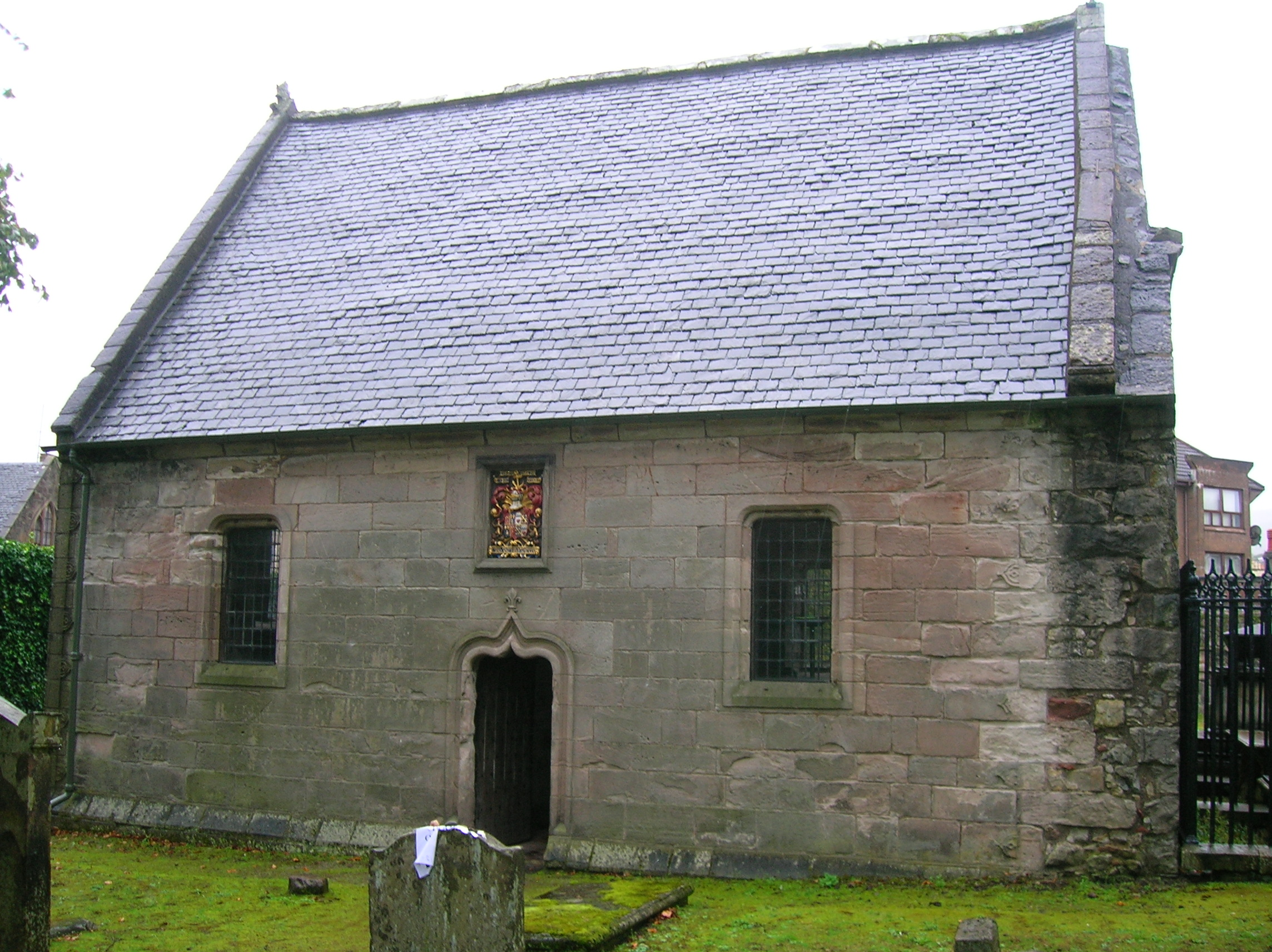
The Skelmorlie Aisle, Largs

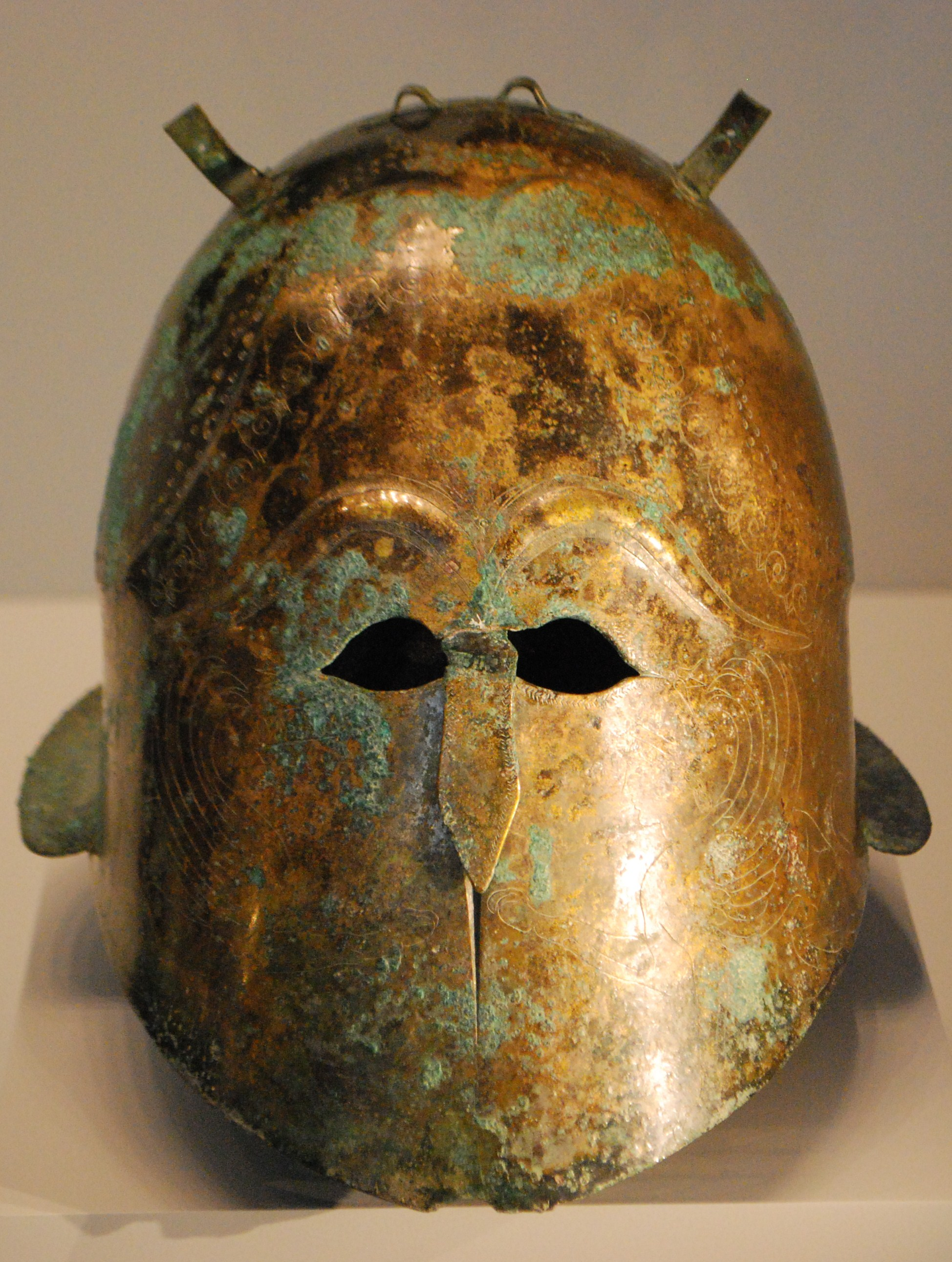
A funerary helmet from South Italy.

King Henry V (d. 1422), Westminster Abbey. Set up over the dead king's monument until the 20th century was his funerary helmet, a finely decorated jousting helm, now kept in the abbey museum.

Edward the Black Prince or Edward of Woodstock (15 June 1330 – 8 June 1376), eldest son of Edward III, King of England. Dating from 1376 his funerary helmet is to be found above his funerary monument in Canterbury Cathedral.

Sir Robert Montgomerie, Skelmorlie Aisle, Largs. An engraving of the 1636 'Montgomery Monument' by McGibbon and Ross in 1886 shows a funerary helm projecting from the southern wall however it shows some differences in appearance from the helm that today sits on the tomb itself. The helm that exists today looks similar to one photographed by the Ministry of Works in 1954. In 1915 an engraving by Robert Bryden does not show a helmet above the south door or on the monument. The surviving helmet could not have been worn as the visor is fixed and holes on the top suggest either a means of attachment or that a crest had once been present.

Sir Thomas Long, St James's Church, Draycot Cerne, Wiltshire. This helmet is of the armet type and was originally part of a collection that until 2009 hung above his grave site, a 'rich gothique altar monument'. His gauntlets were also displayed and both are now kept in the Wiltshire Museum in Devizes. Sir Thomas (1451-1508) had fought in the army of Henry VII against the rebel Perkin Warbeck and received his knighthood at the marriage of Arthur, Prince of Wales.

Sir Hugh Hastings (d. 1347), St. Mary's Church, Elsing, Norfolk, England. One of the early examples of a doubly pivoted visor on a bascinet is located at the funerary monument Sir Hugh.

James Cunninghame, 7th Earl of Glencairn, the Glencairn Aisle, St Maurs-Glencairn church, Kilmaurs, East Ayrshire. Here a helmet has been carved from stone on this 1600 funerary monument and lies next to the effigy of the earl whilst a carved open bible sits next to his wife's effigy.
