= Bill Cunningham (rugby union, born 1900) =

Irish rugby union player

- Full name: William Anthony Joseph Cunningham
- Born: 27 March 1900 Dublin, Ireland
- Died: 13 December 1959 (aged 59) Wandsworth, England
- School: Belvedere College
- Occupation: Dentist

Rugby union career
- Position: Halfback
International career
Years	Team	Apps	(Points)
1920–23	Ireland	8	(3)
1924	British Lions	1	(3)

William Anthony Joseph Cunningham (27 March 1900 — 13 December 1959) was an Ireland and British Lions international rugby union player active in the 1920s.

Cunningham was born in Dublin and attended Belvedere College, where he picked up rugby.

A halfback, Cunningham played his rugby for Lansdowne and was capped eight times for Ireland. He was used as an out-half for his first two years and scored the winning try in a 1921 Five Nations match against Scotland at Lansdowne Road. Jim Wheeler took over as Ireland's out-half in 1922, with Cunningham tried at scrum-half, having combined well with Wheeler in the trials. He finished his Ireland career the following year with eight caps.

Cunningham returned to international rugby in 1924 as a member of the British Lions in South Africa, although not as a tourist. A dentist by profession, Cunningham happened to be working in the African country at the time and was asked to link up with the team partway through the tour after they had suffered a series of injuries. He played the third Test match against the Springboks at Port Elizabeth, scoring their only try in a 3–3 draw.

== See also ==
- List of Ireland national rugby union players
