= William J. Cunningham (Illinois politician) =

American politician

Member of the Illinois House of Representatives
- In office 1965–1971

Personal details
- Born: October 20, 1915 Swanwick, Illinois, U.S.
- Died: May 21, 2009 (aged 93) Du Quoin, Illinois, U.S.
- Party: Republican
- Spouse: Virginia McElroy (m. 1940; div. 1972)
- Children: 2
- Education: University of Illinois Urbana-Champaign

Military service
- Branch/service: United States Army
- Years of service: 1941–1946
- Rank: Major
- Battles/wars: World War II

William J. Cunningham III (October 20, 1915 – May 21, 2009) was an American politician who served as a Republican member of the Illinois House of Representatives from 1965 to 1971.

== Background ==
Cunningham was born in Swanwick, Illinois, in 1915, and attended the University of Illinois Urbana-Champaign. He served in the United States Army Adjutant General's Corps during World War II.

== Career ==
Cunningham was a businessman in Pinckneyville, Illinois. He was elected the town's mayor in 1951, and was re-elected three times. In 1964, he was elected to the Illinois House of Representatives for the first of three terms.

== Personal life and death ==
In 1940, Cunningham married Virginia McElroy; they had two children and divorced in 1972. Cunningham lived in Pinckneyville and attended a local United Methodist Church. He died at a hospital in Du Quoin, Illinois, on May 21, 2009, at the age of 93.
