= Swanwick, Illinois =

- Unincorporated community
- Location within Illinois Location within the United States
- Coordinates: 38°10′11″N 89°32′10″W
- Country: United States
- State: Illinois
- County: Perry
- Elevation: 571 ft (174 m)
- Time zone: UTC-6 (Central (CST))
  - Summer (DST): UTC-5 (CDT)
- Area code: 618
- GNIS feature ID: 419467

Swanwick is an unincorporated community in Perry County, Illinois, United States. Swanwick is located on Illinois Route 13, 4 miles (6.4 km) east-southeast of Coulterville. Swanwick once had a post office, which closed on October 15, 1988.
