= Margaret Cunningham =

Scottish memoirist and strong Protestant

Lady Margaret Cunningham (1580s – September 1623, in Malsly) was a Scottish memoirist and correspondent, the daughter of James Cunningham, 7th Earl of Glencairn (1552–1630) and his first wife Margaret, daughter of Colin Campbell of Glenorchy. She was a keen Protestant and opponent of "that most detestable idollatrie of the papists". Her sister was Lady Ann Cunningham.

== Account of cruelty ==
Lady Margaret suffered great cruelty at the hands of her first husband, Sir James Hamilton of Crawfordjohn (also known as James Hamilton of Libberton), whom she married on 24 January 1598. Initially, she continued to live with her parents and early attempts to join him at his Evandale estate were rebuffed. Her memoir describes him as "unkind, cruell and malicious": he failed to give her money for food, believed "misreports" against her, and turned her out of the house naked in the middle of the night, so that she and her maidservant were forced to take shelter in the minister's house. She states that she was sick and pregnant at the time. As a modern commentator has pointed out, her detailed account is of importance also as "evidence of the acute vulnerability of wives and the inability of law, custom, and even powerful kinsmen to guarantee protection from brutal husbands."

Later, while reconciled with Hamilton, Lady Margaret expressed her strong Protestantism and rejoiced in the possibility of her husband's salvation from "that most detestable idollatrie of the papists." The close of this letter declares an intention to add a "poor basket of stones to the strengthening of the walls of Jerusalem". This follows almost verbatim a passage in Anne Locke's 1590 dedication to the Countess of Warwick.

However, after bearing Hamilton five children, Lady Margaret refused to sleep with him any more because of his adultery and his "excommunication for slaughter". She had left him by the time she wrote up her memoirs in 1608, which were published in Edinburgh in 1827. The estrangement left her living in penury with her children at Libberton in South Lanarkshire. near Crawfordjohn

== Happier marriage ==
After Hamilton's death in or after 1608, Lady Margaret was remarried as the third wife of Sir James Maxwell of Calderwood. Her letters show this to have been a happy marriage. The couple had two sons and four daughters. Her daughter Jean by her first marriage married James, a son of Maxwell by an earlier marriage of his.

After she had been widowed again, Lady Margaret wrote in 1622 from Malsly to her sister, Lady Ann Cunningham, the Marchioness of Hamilton, appealing to her to help the children who survived her and enclosing a will dated 2 October 1622.

== External sources ==
- A longer account of Lady Margaret's memoir: Retrieved 15 November 2015
