= Lady Ann Cunningham =

Scottish cavalry troop leader in battle

The Marchioness of Hamilton
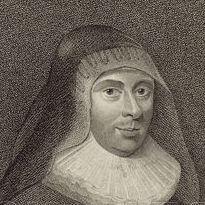
- Published on 1 November 1797, by J Herbert
- Born: approx 1580; Glencairn
- Died: 1646; Hamilton
- Known for: Led a cavalry troop during the Battle of Berwick
- Title: Lady
- Spouse: James Hamilton, 2nd Marquess of Hamilton
- Children: Anne Montgomerie, Countess of Eglinton; Margaret Lindsay, Countess of Crawford; Mary Douglas, Countess of Queensberry; James Hamilton, 1st Duke of Hamilton; William Hamilton, 2nd Duke of Hamilton
- Parent(s): James Cunningham, 7th Earl of Glencairn; Margaret Campbell

Lady Anna (Anne) Cunningham, Marchioness of Hamilton (died 1646) led a mixed-sex cavalry troop during the "Battle" of Berwick on 5 June 1639.

== Background and family ==
Lady Anna was the fourth daughter of James Cunningham, 7th Earl of Glencairn and Margaret, daughter of Sir Colin Campbell of Glenorchy, a family noted for its early commitment to Protestantism. Her sister was the memoirist Lady Margaret Cunningham.

She married James Hamilton, 2nd Marquess of Hamilton on 30 January 1603. They had two sons, James Hamilton, 1st Duke of Hamilton (1606–1649) and William Hamilton, 2nd Duke of Hamilton (1616–1651) and three daughters, Lady Anne Hamilton (married Hugh, 7th Earl of Eglinton), Lady Margaret Hamilton (died 1678, married John, Earl of Crawford and Lindsay) and Lady Mary Hamilton (died 1633, married James Douglas, 2nd Earl of Queensberry).

After her marriage, Ann managed the Hamilton estates, particularly when her husband was at court in London. She wrote account books in an italic hand, using a mixture of Arabic and Roman numerals. She made a payment to her writing teacher Mr John Queen.

== Historical importance ==
Her historical importance is as a defender of the Presbyterian Church in Scotland against Charles I attempts to convert the whole of Scotland to Anglicanism and her active leadership in the National Covenant resistance movement.

Her son, James Hamilton, 1st Duke of Hamilton, had sided with Charles I. When he attempted to land an army on the Scottish Coast in 1639, she organised the defences, raised a cavalry troop, and "came forth with pistol which she vowed to discharge upon her son if he offered to come ashore." A correspondent of the time, Edward Norgate, wrote, "She goeth in armour and with a pistoll by her side readie charged, and wishes him there, saying shee would burie the bullets in his bowells."

The cavalry rode under a banner showing a hand repelling a prayer book with the motto For God, the King, Religion and the Covenant. This was at the time of the Battle of Berwick on 5 June 1639.

The struggle with Charles I led to the Scots' right to a free church assembly and a free parliament.

Her great-great-grandson was Sir William Hamilton the husband of Emma, Lady Hamilton who is best known as the mistress of Lord Nelson.
