= Jim Wheeler (rugby union) =

Rugby union player from Northern Ireland

- Full name: James Reid Wheeler
- Born: 27 December 1898 Belfast, Ireland
- Died: 22 March 1973 (aged 74) Belfast, Northern Ireland
- School: Methodist College Belfast
- University: Queen's University Belfast
- Occupation: Ophthalmologist

Rugby union career
- Position: Outside-half
International career
Years	Team	Apps	(Points)
1922–24	Ireland	5	(0)

James Reid Wheeler (27 December 1898 — 22 March 1973) was an Irish international rugby union player.

The son of a surgeon, Wheeler was born and raised in Belfast, attending Methodist College Belfast. He enlisted with the Royal Artillery in 1917 and was mentioned in despatches during his service.

Wheeler played as an outside-half for Queen's University RFC while a medical student and was capped five times for Ireland, from 1922 to 1924, then became a referee and officiated three Calcutta Cup fixtures.

A specialist in ophthalmology, Wheeler was made a fellow of the Royal College of Surgeons of Edinburgh in 1929 and lectured at Queen's University. He remained involved in rugby, serving as president of the IRFU in 1959–60.

== See also ==
- List of Ireland national rugby union players
