= Willie Cunningham (footballer, born 1925) =

Scottish footballer

Personal information
- Full name: William Carruthers Cunningham
- Date of birth: 22 February 1925
- Place of birth: Hill of Beath, Fife, Scotland
- Date of death: 27 November 2000 (aged 75)
- Place of death: Preston, Lancashire, England
- Position: Right back

Senior career*
Years	Team	Apps	(Gls)
- Crossgates Primrose
1946	Dunfermline Athletic	3	(0)
1946–1949	Airdrieonians	93	(9)
1949–1963	Preston North End	437	(3)
1963–1965	Southport	12	(0)
Total		545	(12)

International career
1952	Scotland B	1	(0)
1954–1955	Scotland	8	(0)

Managerial career
- 1964–1965: Southport
- * Club domestic league appearances and goals

William Carruthers Cunningham (22 February 1925 – 27 November 2000) was a Scottish footballer who played in both Scotland and England.

Born in Hill of Beath, Fife, Cunningham began his career as a centre half with Dunfermline Athletic, combining part-time football with a mining job in the local colliery. He moved to Airdrieonians along with Willie Kelly and scored 9 goals in 93 appearances for the Diamonds before a £5,000 fee took him south to Preston North End on 28 June 1949.

Cunningham had by this stage converted to playing as a full-back and made his North End debut against Grimsby Town at Deepdale on 24 August 1949. 12 years later he made his four hundredth league appearance in a goalless draw against Bolton Wanderers on 18 April 1961, the last of the 1953–54 Cup Final team still playing for the club.

Cunningham was capped eight times for his native Scotland – including captaining the side during the 1954 World Cup finals. On leaving Preston in 1963 he had a brief spell as player/manager at Southport before returning to Deepdale as Reserve Team trainer.

== Honours ==
Preston North End

- FA Cup runner-up: 1953–54

== See also ==
- List of Scotland national football team captains
