= Willie Cunningham (footballer, born 1938) =

Scottish footballer

Personal information
- Full name: William Livingstone Cunningham
- Date of birth: 11 July 1938 (age 88)
- Place of birth: Paisley, Scotland
- Position: Wing half

Senior career*
Years	Team	Apps	(Gls)
–	Renfrew		
1956–1957	St Mirren	1	(0)
1957–1964	Third Lanark	114	(7)
1964–1965	Barnsley	24	(0)
1965–1968	Stirling Albion	44	(0)
Total		183	(7)
- * Club domestic league appearances and goals

William Livingstone Cunningham (born 11 July 1938) is a Scottish former footballer who played as a wing half for St Mirren, Third Lanark, Barnsley and Stirling Albion. He played in the 1959 Scottish League Cup Final which Third Lanark lost to Heart of Midlothian.
