= William Cunningham, 9th Earl of Glencairn =

Scottish nobleman

William Cunningham, 9th Earl of Glencairn (Scottish Gaelic: Uilleam Coineagan) (1610–1664), was a Scottish nobleman an Lord Chancellor of Scotland. He was also the chief of Clan Cunningham.

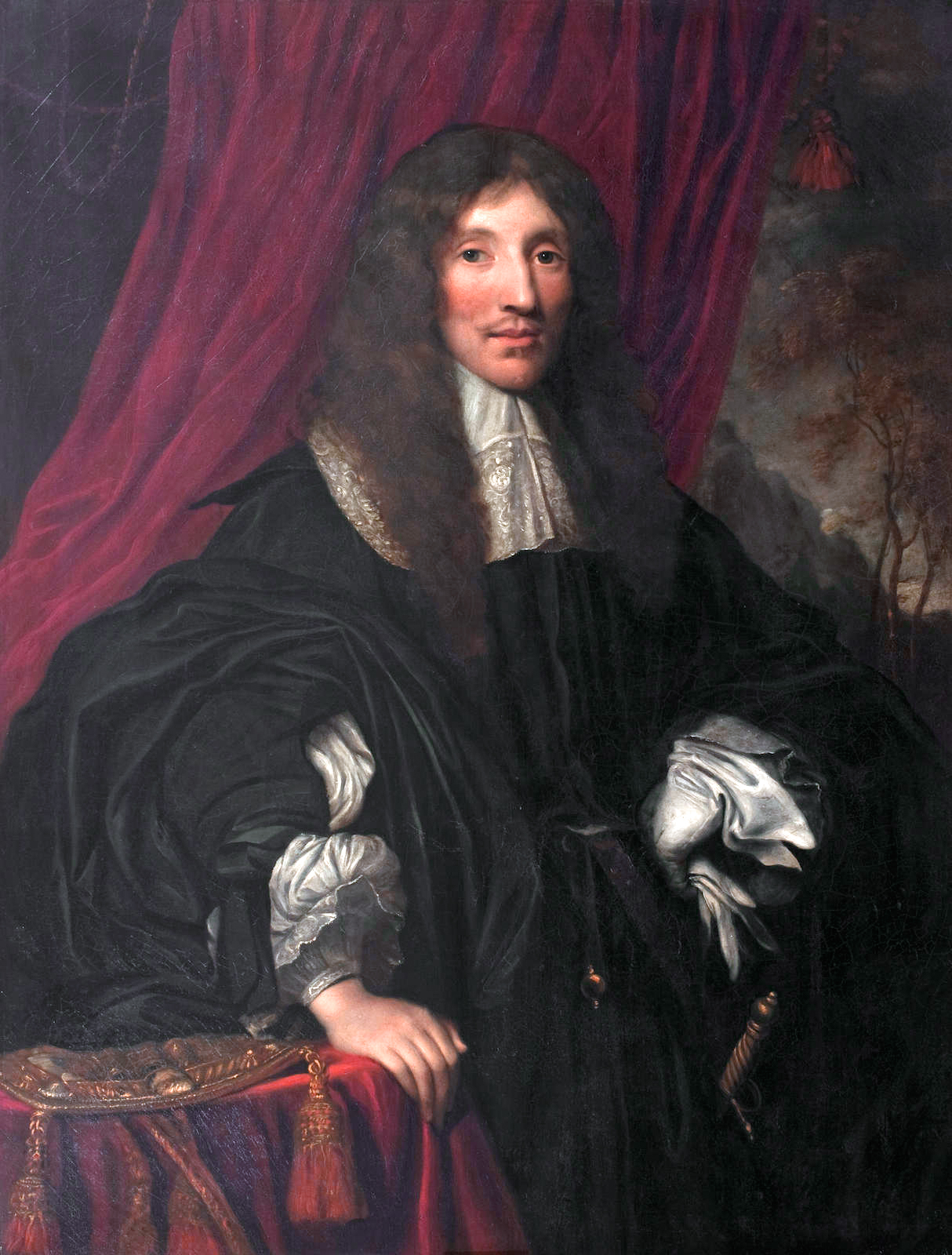
William Cunningham, 9th Earl of Glencairn, by follower of John Michael Wright

The eldest son of William Cunningham, 8th Earl of Glencairn, on 21 July 1637 this William obtained a ratification from King Charles I of Scotland, under the Royal Sign Manual, of the original Glencairn letters patent of 1488.

He was sworn a member of the Privy Council of Scotland and in 1641 was appointed a Commissioner of the Treasury.

Finlaystone House and estate in Inverclyde was the seat of the Earl of Glencairn and chief of clan Cunningham from 1405 to 1796.

== Royalist ==
The Earl supported the Royalist cause of his King, and in 1643 joined with the Duke of Hamilton and the Earls of Lanark and Roxburgh, in opposing the sending of a Scottish army into England to assist the English Parliamentary Army. For this loyalty he received a (now published) personal letter from the King.

He was appointed Lord Justice General by parliament in 1646. He knew of and is said to have "entered heartily into" the attempted rescue of Charles I in 1648, and was subsequently deprived by parliament of this post on 15 February 1649, under the Act of Classes. The parliament, now being dominant, at the instance of the Public Prosecutor, then passed a Decreet, on 2 March 1650, annulling the original Glencairn Letters Patent of 1488. (This was rescinded at the Restoration).

Glencairn then led an insurrection in the Highlands in 1653 in favour of King Charles II, when General Monck had possession of Scotland. In January 1654, he was commissioned by Charles II to command the royal forces in all of Scotland, numbering some 3,500 men, pending the arrival of General Middleton. The insurrection of that year is generally known as "Glencairn's rising", although he later handed his command to Middleton. About this time, Glencairn and Lieutenant-General Sir George Munro, 1st of Newmore, engaged in a duel with both pistols & swords two miles to the south of Dornoch. Munro had poured scorn on the quality of their forces and Glencairn had defended them, challenging Munro, who lost but was only wounded. Middleton initially placed the Earl under arrest, but the Earl left the army a fortnight later.

He was then arrested by Monck in 1655, who later permitted him to return home. Glencairn was excepted from Cromwell's Act of Grace and Pardon.

== Restoration ==
He was one of the peers whom Monck called to the convention he summoned when he was about to march into England in 1659. It was at this convention that Glencairn called for Monck to declare for a free parliament.

Upon the Restoration, Glencairn waited upon King Charles II at London, when he was again sworn a Privy Councillor and appointed Sheriff Principal of Ayrshire. On 19 January 1661, he was constituted Lord Chancellor of Scotland for life, upon the resignation of the Earl of Loudoun.

Glencairn was Chancellor of the University of Glasgow from 1660, and was one of the principal advisors of the re-establishment of Episcopacy in Scotland. He was not, however, opposed to Presbyterianism, and the subsequent bitter disputes between the two religious factions, and particularly against James Sharp, Archbishop of St Andrews, greatly distressed him and affected his health.

The Earl died at Belton, East Lothian, on 30 May 1663, aged 54 years. According to some sources, he was buried with great pomp in the south-east aisle of St. Giles Cathedral in Edinburgh, on 28 July following. He had a daughter, Margaret, who in 1662 married John Hamilton, 2nd Lord Bargany, a descendant of James Hamilton, 2nd Earl of Arran (1517–1575).

According to other sources, he was/is not buried in St Giles Cathedral Edinburgh. It was not a burial Church but it does contain memorials of other celebrated Scots. In the old kirkyard, now a carpark, were buried John Knox and William Forbes.

Legend has it that his wife had his head removed and out of love kept it with her. She was buried in the Glencairn Aisle in Kilmaurs and the earls head was buried with her.

== Family ==
Cunningham married Lady Ann Ogilvy, the daughter of James Ogilvy, 1st Earl of Findlater, in 1637 and they produced four sons and four daughters.

- William, who died at the age of eighteen
- James, who married Lady Elizabeth Hamilton daughter of William Hamilton, 2nd Duke of Hamilton, but pre-deceased his father
- Alexander, who succeeded his father as Earl
- John, who succeeded his brother Alexander as Earl
- Jean, who married William Boyd, 1st Earl of Kilmarnock
- Margaret, who married John Hamilton, 2nd Lord Bargany
- Anne, who died unwed
- Elizabeth, who married William Hamilton of Colestoun

After his first wife died in 1661 from measles, he then married Lady Margaret Montgomery, the daughter of Alexander Montgomerie, 6th Earl of Eglinton. She was widow of John Hay, 1st Earl of Tweeddale. They produced no children.

== See also ==
- Kilmaurs Place, a property of the 9th Earl of Glencairn.

Legal offices
Preceded by Sir Thomas Hope	Lord Justice General; 1646–1649	Succeeded by 6th Earl of Cassilis
Academic offices
Preceded by John Thurloe	Chancellor of the University of Glasgow; 1660–1661	Succeeded by Andrew Fairfowl
Political offices
Preceded by The Earl of Loudoun	Lord Chancellor of Scotland; 1661–1664	Succeeded by The Duke of Rothes
Peerage of Scotland
Preceded by William Cunningham	Earl of Glencairn; 1630–1664	Succeeded by Alexander Cunningham
