= Colin Campbell of Glenorchy =

Scottish courtier and landowner

Colin Campbell of Glenorchy (1499–1583) was a Scottish courtier and landowner.

== Life ==
Colin Campbell was the son of Colin Campbell (d. 1523), reckoned 3rd laird of Glenorchy, and Margaret Stewart (d. 1524), daughter of John Stewart, 2nd Earl of Atholl. As a child, he was fostered with Fearnan MacGregors.

As a younger son he was given the lands of Crannich on the north shore of Loch Tay. He married Margaret Stewart, daughter of Alexander Stewart, Bishop of Moray, and widow of Patrick Graham of Inchbrakie.

He became laird of Glenorchy in 1550 upon the death of his older brother John in 1550. He married Katherine Ruthven, a daughter of William Ruthven, 2nd Lord Ruthven and Janet Haliburton, heiress of Patrick Haliburton of Dirleton and sister of Mariotta Haliburton, Countess of Home. In middle-age became known as "Grey Colin" or "Cailean Liath" because of his white hair and long flowing beard.

One of his first actions as laird, was to evict the Clan Gregor from Balloch at the east end of Loch Tay. In 1552 he built a tower house known then as Balloch Castle, and now as Taymouth Castle. Balloch means "house at the narrow pass." Colin is said to have chosen the site of the castle in a novel manner. He was apparently instructed in a dream to found the castle on the spot where he first heard a blackbird sing, whilst making his way down the strath of the Tay.

On 3 August 1564 Mary, Queen of Scots wrote from Glen Tilt to Colin Campbell of Glenorchy, asking him to demolish a house of strength on an island in Loch Rannoch. The Clan Macdonald of Clanranald were rebuilding the house, which her father James V had previously ordered to be demolished.

There was a feud between the Campbells and the Clan Gregor. In 1569, the clan chief Gregor Roy MacGregor was visiting his wife and was captured by Colin Campbell. On 7 April 1570, after securing the consent of the Regent Morton, Colin personally beheaded Gregor at Balloch, in the presence of the Earl of Atholl, the Justice Clerk. Gregor's wife, Marion Campbell, who also witnessed her husband's execution, wrote a bitter lament about the affair, called 'Griogal Cridhe'. The fighting continued until a settlement was finally reached between the two clans in the winter of 1570.

As a landowner, Colin claimed to have 'the power of pit and gallows', which was the right to imprison and execute. In the Black Book of Taymouth, Sir Colin was described as a great 'justiciar' of his time, who sustained the deadly feud with the Gregor clan and executed many notable lymmars (rogues).

James VI visited Balloch Castle in August 1582, tipping the gardener 40 shillings. However, only a few days later, the king was seized at the Ruthven Raid.

Colin died on 11 April 1583 and was buried at Finlarig.

Grey Colin wrote and kept a large number of letters.

== Marriages and children ==
Colin had eleven children from two marriages. Children from his first marriage with Margaret Stewart include:

- Beatrix Campbell
- Margaret Campbell

Children from his second marriage to Katherine Ruthven include:

- Duncan Campbell of Glenorchy, who married Jean Stewart, daughter of John Stewart, 4th Earl of Atholl and Margaret Fleming, on 11 July 1574.
- Colin Campbell of Glenample
- Patrick Campbell of Auchinyre
- Archibald Campbell of Monzie
- Margaret Campbell, who married James Cunningham, 7th Earl of Glencairn
- Katherine Campbell
- Annas or Elizabeth Campbell
- a daughter who married Gregor MacGregor.
- Mary Campbell (1572-1618), who married John Graham, 6th Earl of Menteith
