= Kilmaurs Place =

House in East Ayrshire, Scotland

- Kilmaurs, North Ayrshire, Scotland; UK grid reference NS64741920

Site information
- Type: A castle with a later laird's house
- Owner: Private
- Controlled by: Earls of Glencairn
- Open to the public: No
- Condition: Partly ruined and robbed

Location
- Kilmaurs Place
- Location within Scotland
- Coordinates: 55.637694°N 4.523611°W

Site history
- Built: 14th century
- Built by: Clan Cunningham
- In use: 14th to present
- Materials: Stone

Kilmaurs Place, The Place or Kilmaurs House, is an old mansion house and the ruins of Kilmaurs Tower grid reference NS41234112 are partly incorporated, Kilmaurs, East Ayrshire, Scotland. The house stands on a prominence above the Carmel Water and has a commanding view of the surrounding area. Once the seat of the Cunningham Earls of Glencairn, it ceased to be the main residence after 1484 when Finlaystone became the family seat. Not to be confused with Kilmaurs Castle that stood on the lands of Jocksthorn Farm.

== The History of Kilmaurs Place. ==
=== Introduction ===
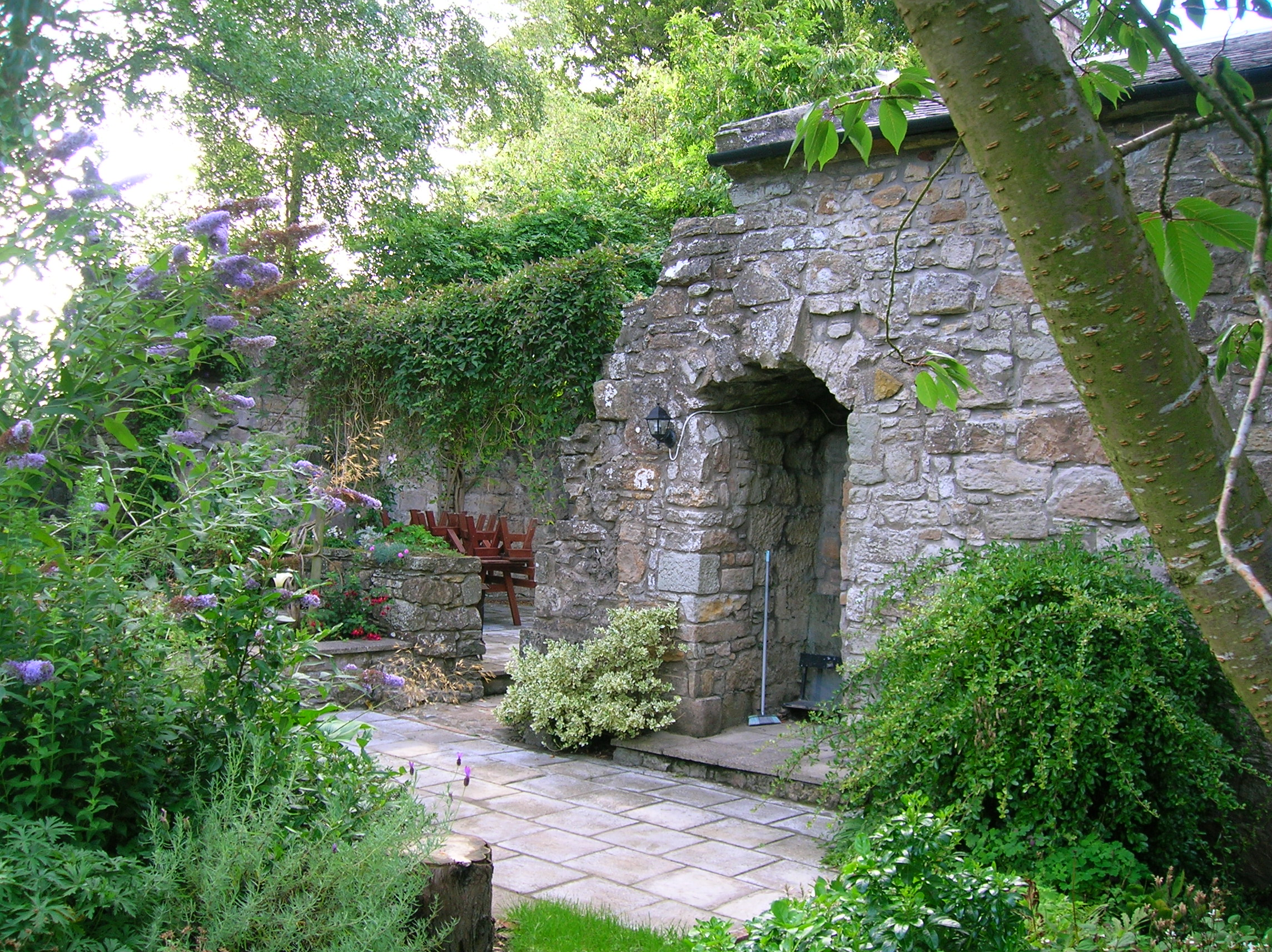
A view of the old castle building complex.

The ruined part of the buildings seen today are from Kilmaurs Tower that replaced the original Kilmaurs Castle that was located near Jocksthorn. The later tower castle at Kilmaurs Place was "the ane ancient, strong building, belonging to the Earl of Glencairne, environed with a fair parke, called Carmell wod, from the watter of Carmell that runs by it." Kilmaurs Place, a replacement for Kilmaurs Tower at this site, was begun by William Cunningham, 9th Earl of Glencairn (1610–1664), Lord Chancellor of Scotland (1660–1664). A most extensive and imposing building was intended, however financial problems and his unexpected death resulted the abandonment of the original design; today's structure represents the remnants of the unfinished mansion.

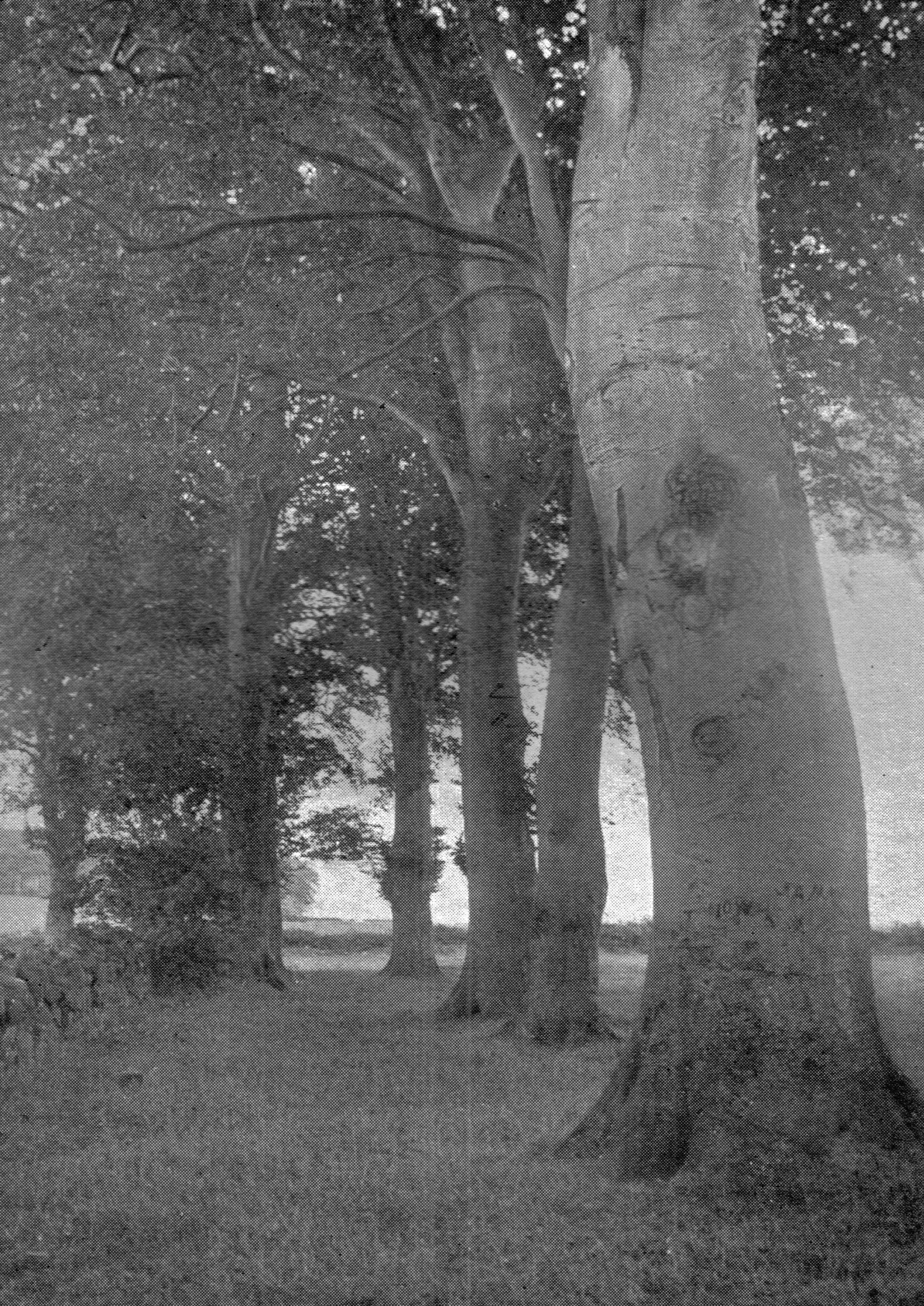
The Beech tree avenue leading up to Kilmaurs Place in 1912.

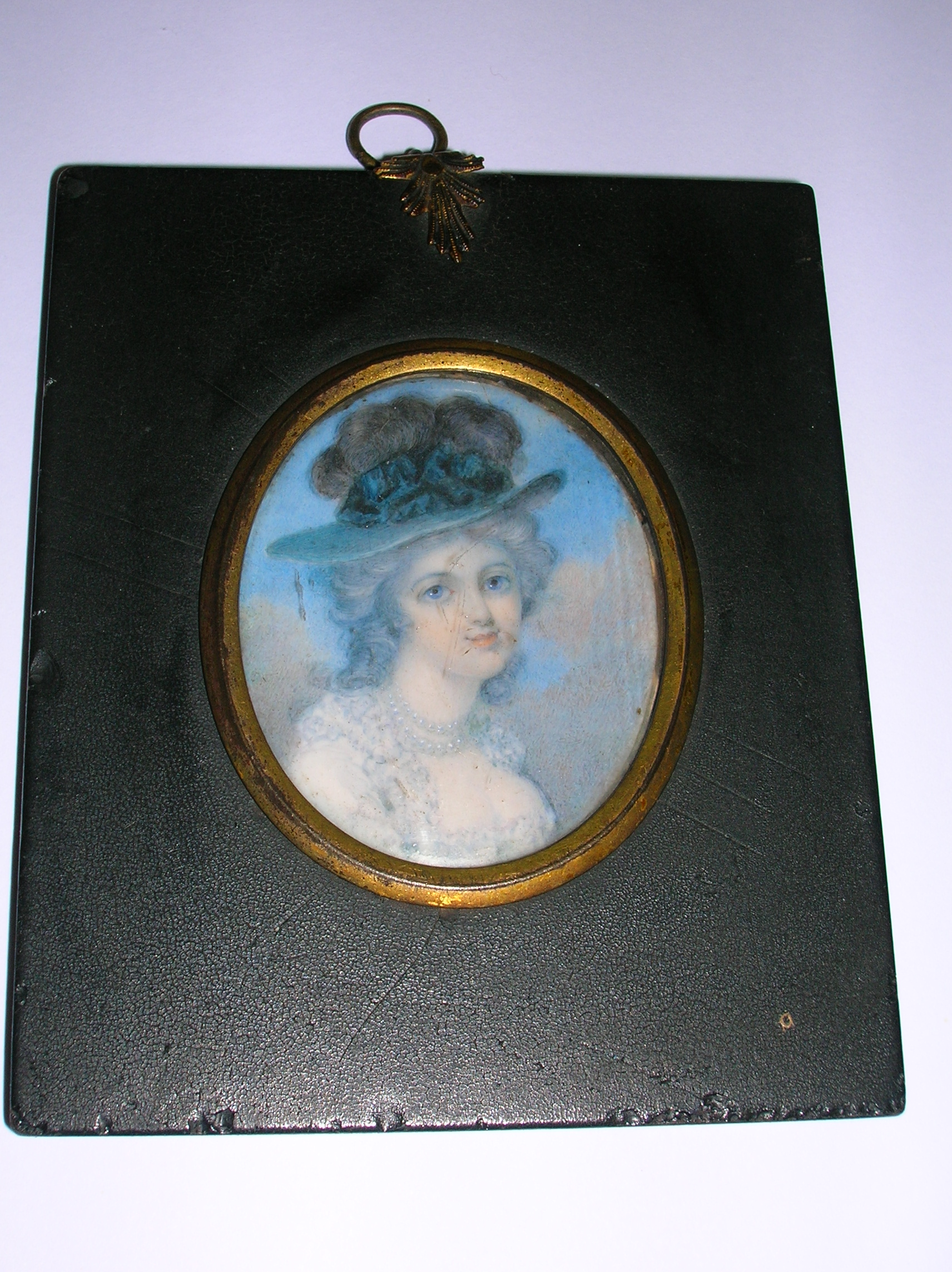
A miniature watercolour painting of Susanna Montgomery, Lady Eglinton.

The Statistical Account of 1791–1799 states that "...the house known by the name of the Place, was poffeffed by them, where the late Chancellor had laid the foundation of a very extenfive building, and executed part of it; but from embarraffments of fortune, from which he expected to be relieved by Government, in whofe service, he incurred them, was obliged to give up the plan."

Kilmaurs Place is said by the Royal Commission, following McNaught, to be a 17th-century mansion abutting the East wall of its predecessor (NS44SW 16), Kilmaurs Tower, the construction works on the previous building having ceased upon the death of the 9th Earl of Glencairn. Tranter regards it as having been erected against the east wall of its predecessor, Kilmaurs Tower.

Etymology
Carmel, the oldest form of which is Caremuall, is thought to be derived, according to McNaught, from the Gaelic 'Car' meaning a 'fort', and 'Meall'. meaning a hill. Therefore, 'The fort on the hill'.

Adamson in 1875 calls the building 'My Lord's Place' and goes on to say that "With the exception of the mansion-house which is in an excellent state of preservation, blocks of masonry adjacent to it are much decayed, and at first sight seem the remains of a large building that time has shattered and almost leveled to the ground. But this is not the case. The seeming ruins are nothing more than the remnant of the walls of an elegant structure which was in the course of erection during the lifetime of the Lord Chancellor of Scotland, William, ninth 9th Earl of Glencairn." Hume describes The Place as being built in around 1620, with a T-plan and a turnpike stair leading to the upper levels in the projecting jamb. He sees the ruins as being part of the tower that preceded the existing house.

McMichael regards the remains as being the ruins of the old castle. Tranter sees the picturesque mansion as being erected against the East wall of its predecessor, the Kilmaurs Tower. In 1935 it was occupied by the tenants of the adjoining farm and the internally he noted that many alterations had taken place. Salter regards the present house as having been built on the site of an older castle. Davis sees the whole range as possibly being the lower floor of an unfinished palace of 16th-century date. Close in 2012 sees the ruins as being part of a tower house of the 15th century and the main building a mansion house dating from around 1630 with some features in common with the 1643 Fenwick Parish Church.

=== Kilmaurs House and the Cunninghams of Robertland ===
In March 1537 David Cuninghame of Robertland raised an action against William, Lord Semple for spoilation. In July 1520 Lord Semple led a raid on Kilmaurs and is accused of wrongful, violent and masterful spoilation of David Cunninghame and his servants and followers by seizing "his place, houssis and Kirkland of Kilmawris." He is said to have taken jewels, silver, gold, some as coins and other items from the house and lands. A dozen "gret silver sponis" are specifically mentioned.

In July 1616 William, Lord Kilmaurs, conveyed "the lands of Coktress, the manorplace of Kilmaurs, the Waird, Quhatfauld, Bathe, Jakisthorn, etc.," to David Cunningham of Robertland. and the property was in use by William Logan, the Robertland Estate Factor, when a series of letters were written here from May 1774 to 1784.

=== Kilmaurs House and the Montgomerie family ===
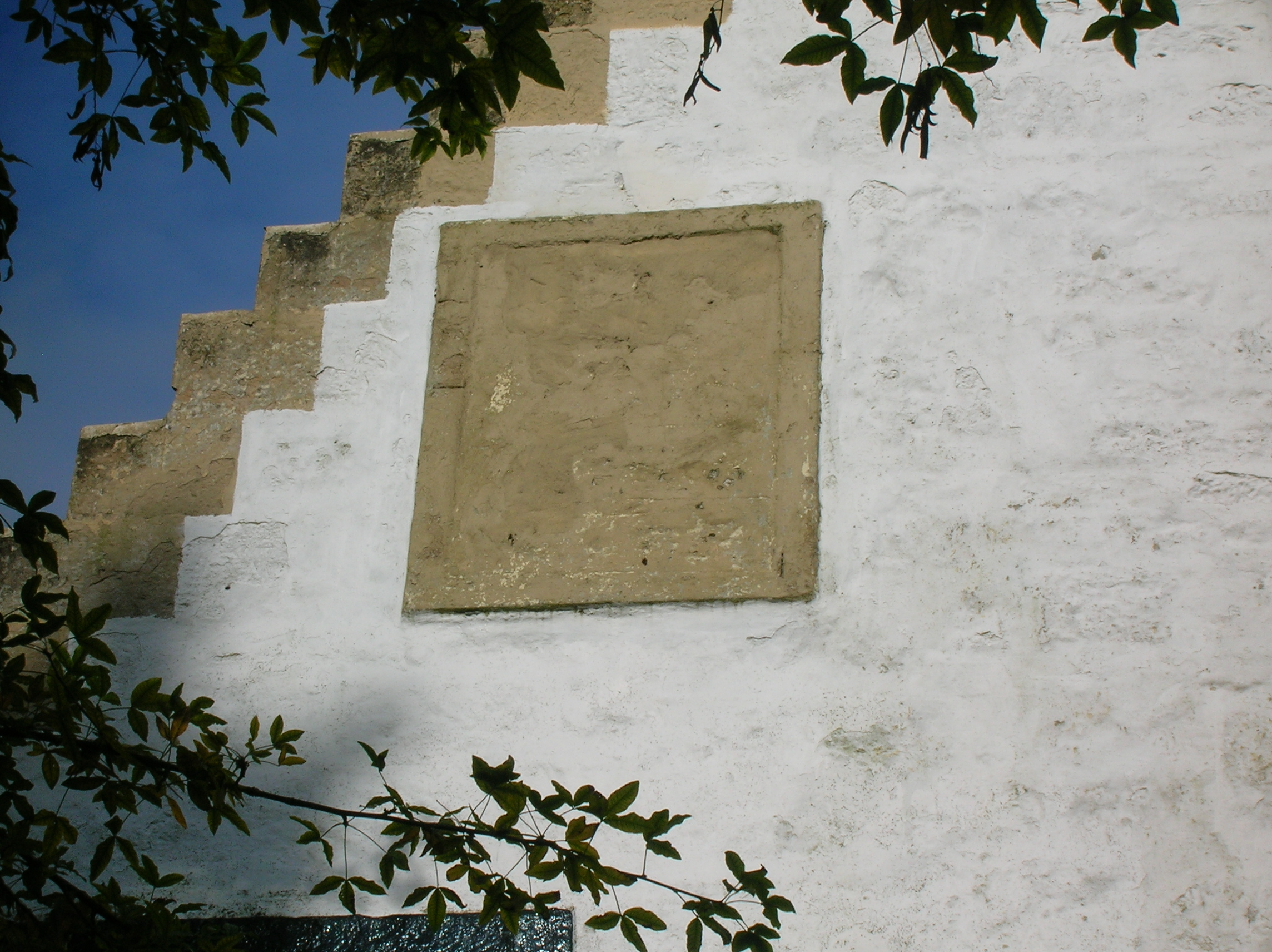
A former window. An identical blocked window is located at the other gable end of the building.

The remainder of the Barony of Kilmaurs, together with 'The Place' was purchased by Alexander, 9th Earl of Eglinton from William Cunningham, 12th Earl of Glencairn, circa 1720. The term 'Kilmaurs House' was used at this time.

It was occupied at one time by Susanna Montgomery, Lady Eglinton, dowager Countess of Eglinton. It was traditional and practical for a dowager to move out of the family seat and dwell within a dower house. Susanna as dowager countess seems to have first moved to Kilmaurs Place and she later, after 1762, moved to Auchans House near Dundonald, South Ayrshire. Letters from 1751 to 1762 are recorded as being written at Kilmars (sic) and from 1765 they are recorded as being written at Auchans House.

Susanna wrote a description of Kilmaurs House to one of her daughters, Lady Mary Murray, in the winter of 1751; illustrating its condition at the time of her taking up occupancy:

The house I am in is a very odd one at present, but I have leave to make the most of it, I hope to make it sum better than a minister's mans. No bodie is fonder of a good house than I am; but when I compare that want to other disappointments I have mete with it appears a nothing. I have carpenders and masons still working at it. It's necessity that makes me continue with them. It held out neither wind nor weet, and I twice fell through the floor. But as they do it by the piece, the expence comes to the same. So soon as it is habitable I'll intreat the pleasure of seeing you. We have plenty of fine coall, and for an inland place it's pritty, but near a village, from which I find disadvanages.

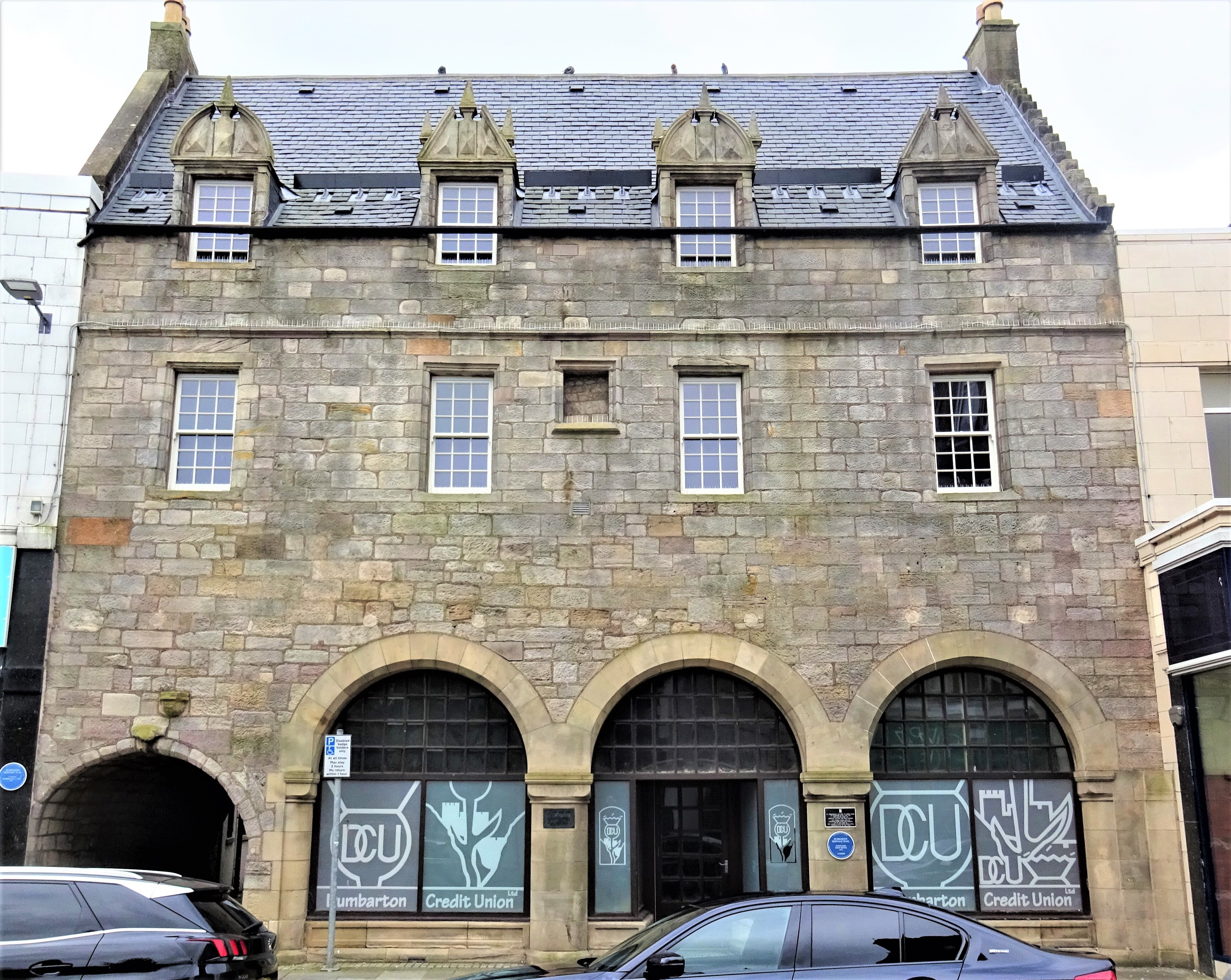
The 1623 Glencairn Greit House in Dumbarton High Street. Town House of the Earls of Glencairn built after the sale of Kilmaurs Place.

In 1762 she writes in a letter to her son-in-law James Moray of Abercairney that her son (the tenth earl) has given her Auchans House and that she was about to repair it. Millar records that after the murder, by gauger (exciseman) Mungo Campbell, of her son Alexander, tenth Earl of Eglintoun, in 1769, she retired from the position which she held in society; and when her second son Archibald (the 11th Earl) was married in 1772, she took up her residence permanently at Auchans.

In 1820 the property was owned by Lady Montgomery Burgess, grand-daughter of the 9th Earl of Eglinton.

William Logan, the Robertland Estate Factor lived at Kilmaurs Place and employed a Robert Burnes and wrote a series of letters from May 1774 to 1784 to his employer that sometimes refer to Robert, uncle of the poet. Logan later lived at Thorntoun House. In 1793 Captain Ralston, of Warwickhill resided in Kilmaurs House / The Place.

In 1786 the 14th Earl of Glencairn sold The Place to the Marchioness of Titchfield.

The Place and Morton Park, part of the old estate, was gifted to the people of Kilmaurs by Lady Sophia Montgomerie, daughter of the 14th Earl of Eglinton; she died in 1942. It was named however after the Morton family of Lochgreen in 1921, the official opening being on 9 September 1922. The house was later sold and passed into general ownership.

==== The Maak's Well ====
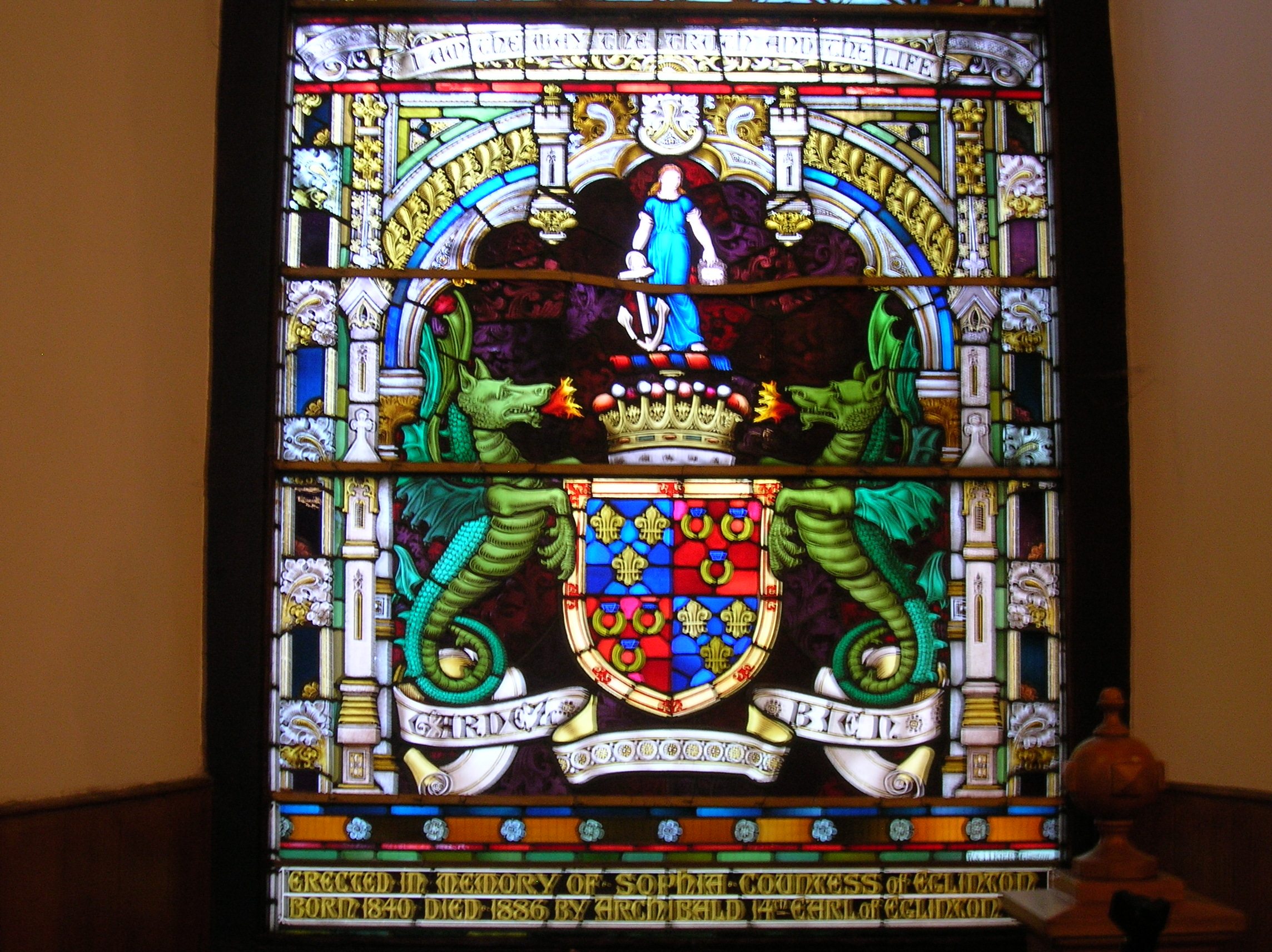
Memorial to Lady Sophia Montgomerie.

The Monk's or Mack's Well water runs into the Carmel beneath Kilmaurs Place. It is said that many years ago the laird tried to prevent the local people from using the well. It dried up until the lord changed his mind, but has run continuously ever since. Stepping stones gave access from the other bank until a footbridge was built in 1824. The local pronunciation is close to 'Mank's well.'

One summer the Carmel almost dried up, but the Maak's well did not, and locals farmers brought their carts up the riverbed to collect water in barrels, etc. In 2013 the well no longer runs into the Carmel Water following new railings being installed at the stream bank.

==== Etymology ====
The modern view is that the name Kilmaurs itself is derived from the Gaelic Cil Mor Ais, meaning 'Hill of the Great Cairn', rather than being the 'Cell' of Saint Maurs.

=== Kilmaurs as the Clan Cunningham seat ===
William, 9th Earl of Glencairn

The coat of arms of the Cunninghams, Earls of Glencairn in 1764.

Sir William Cunningham of Kilmaurs, married Margaret Denniston of Glencairn & Finlaystone in the late 14th-century and from this time Kilmaurs became increasing less significant as a family seat, Finlaystone being the preferred home. Sir William's grandson, Alexander Cunningham, was created Ist Earl of Glencairn on 28 May 1488. The Cunningham chiefs had a much reduced connection with the barony of Kilmaurs after 1484 when Finlaystone became the de facto family seat.

Sir William had married Margaret Denniston who was the sole heir to Sir Robert Denniston in 1405 and the dowry included the baronies of Denniston and Finlaystone in Renfrewshire, the lands of Kilmaronock in Dumbartonshire, and the barony of Glencairn in Dumfrieshire. In 1545 Kerelaw Castle was the summer dwelling of the Earl of Glencairn and Finlaystone was the winter abode. The Cunninghams of Hill of Beith Castle and Caddel were a cadet branch of the Cunninghams of Kilmaurs.

=== William Cunningham of Kilmaurs (1610–1664), 9th Earl of Glencairn ===
The 1764 coat of arms of the Montgomeries, Earls of Eglinton and one time owners of Kilmaurs Place.

William Cunningham, 9th Earl of Glencairn was at first a loyal supporter of Charles I and for this reason he was forced to forfeit his title to the Scottish Parliament; but in time he realized the possibility of Scotland being drawn into the feud between Charles and his Parliament in London, upon which his support for this absolute monarch quickly diminished. William's title was restored and following the execution of Charles I, he fought with the Highland clans against General Monck when Oliver Cromwell invaded Scotland.

Following a personal duel and skirmishes in the ranks he withdrew his forces. He thereafter fought Monk's columns at Dumbarton where overwhelming odds forced him to surrender on honorable terms. He returned home but was thrown into prison on suspicion of plotting, being mistrusted by Archbishop Sharp. Following the Restoration, Charles II rewarded him with the appointment of Privy Councilor. A few years later in 1660 he was elevated to Lord Chancellor, during which time he started to enlarge Kilmaurs Place. Further political intrigues reduced his power and standing greatly and he died a disillusioned man. The large vaulted room in Kilmaurs Place is known as the 'Chancellor's Hall or Study.'

His second wife was Lady Margaret Montgomerie, daughter of the 6th Earl of Eglinton. It is recorded that upon his death she had his head removed and kept it in her chamber with instructions that it should be placed in her coffin when she died. In the 1780s when the vault was opened to bury Hamilton of Bardowie the reddish coloured skull of the 9th Earl was encountered.

=== The Ralston family ===
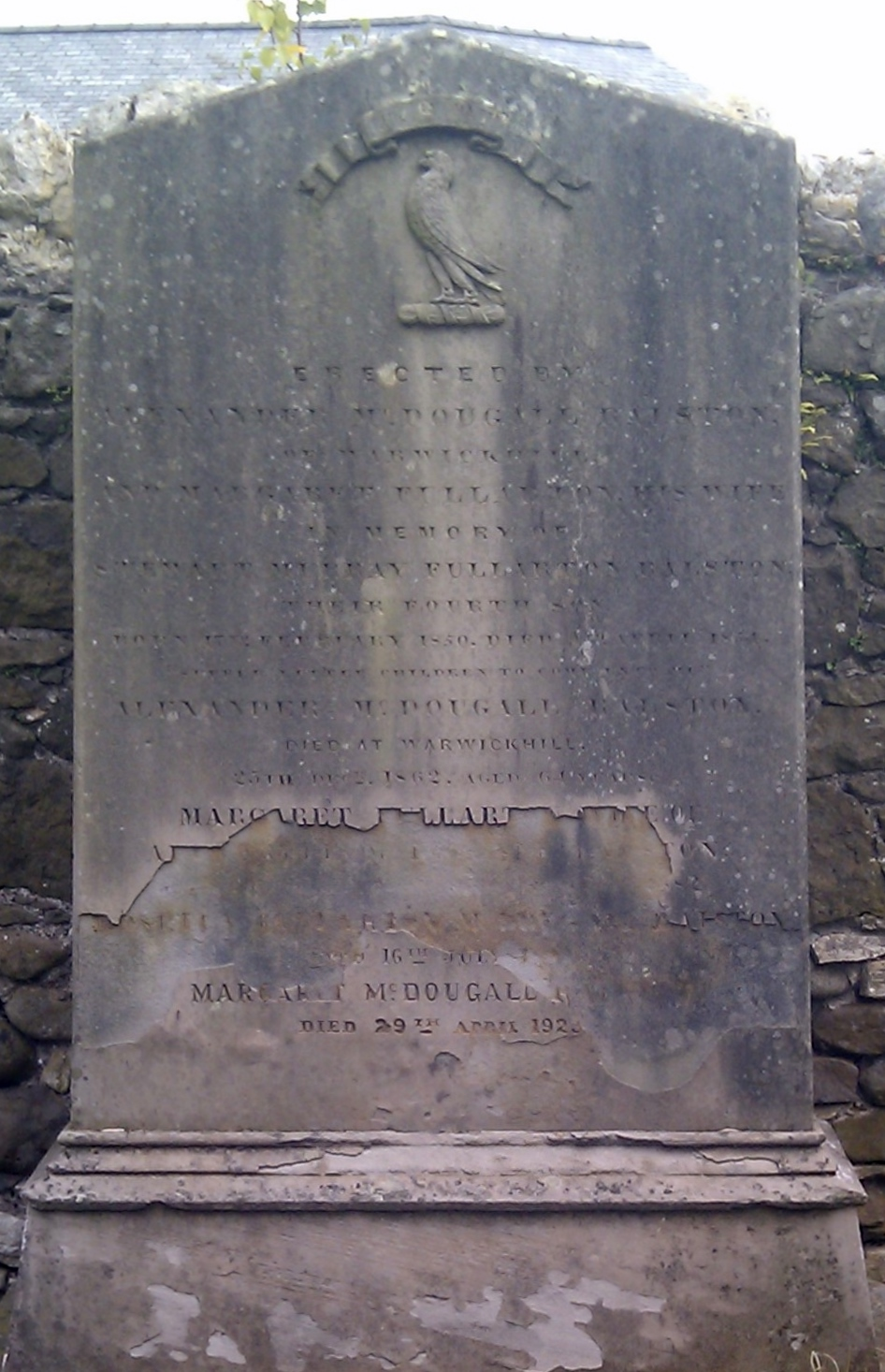
Memorial to Alexander McDougal Ralston of Warwickhill.

Captain William Ralston was factor to the Earl of Eglinton and, as stated, was living in Kilmaurs at The Place in 1793. The Statistical Account of Scotland 1791–1799 Vol IX p 365-6 (Kilmaurs) states that: "Mr William Ralston, factor to the Earl of Eglinton, lives in this parish, and possesses a large farm. His attention to, and dispatch in business, is superior to that of most men. The interest of an employer was never better served than Lord Eglinton's is by him; and with such ease does he manage his own affairs, that one would imagine he has none to manage; yet it is this gentleman who subsets at L.5 the acre, the arable land of his farm, and the pasture at L.1: 14: 10. Under the influence of such gentlemen, agriculture must flourish..."

William Ralston married Elizabeth Dun on 5 October 1783 in Kilmaurs, Ayrshire. Elizabeth Dun died in 1806. Children from this marriage were: Gavin Ralston (Cornet, 25th Regiment of Light Dragoon); John Ralston (Lieutenant, 25th Regiment of Light Dragoons); William Ralston who died in 1805, Robert Ralston who was born on 29 June 1788 in Kilmaurs, Ayrshire and died in 1796, at age 8; Mary Ralston was born before 14 September 1793 in Kilmaurs, Ayrshire and died in 1796, about age 3. His marriage to Elizabeth Dun seems to conflict with the report in the History of the County of Ayr p453 where it is stated he married his cousin Agnes Ralston. This marriage is listed in Scotland's People. He was previously "married" to Anny Leitch and there are legal documents relating to this in the NRS, Edinburgh under the ref. CC8/6/725. A copy of his will in 1837 is held by Scotlands People and his wife was taken to court in 1833 over a possible insurance fraud. He was initially a sergeant in the additional companies of the 71st Fraser Highland Regiment in 1778. Alexander McDougal Ralston of Warwickhill is buried in the cemetery at Dreghorn Parich Church. He died at the age of 64 in 1862.

A Major Ralston was in the group that witnessed the murder of the 10th Earl of Eglinton by gauger Mungo Campbell at Ardrossan on 24 October 1769. The earl was visiting his properties in the area at the time and was accompanied by others, including his then factor, John Foulis.

== Chronology ==
Dates associated with the site taken from this article using the terms 'Kilmaurs Castle' for the original castle near Jocks Thorn and 'Kilmaurs Tower' for the later castle. The spelling 'Cunningham' is used for consistency.

1484 - Earls of Glencairn transfer their family seat to Finlaystone Castle after inheriting that castle in 1405.

1520 - David Cunninghame of Robertland recorded as being in possession of the "place, houssis and Kirklands of Kilmawris".

1527 - Cuthbert Cunningham, 3rd Earl, living at both Kilmaurs Tower and Jocksthorn.

1600 - William Cunningham, 7th Earl, commissions his memorial in the Glencairn Aisle at St Maurs-Glencairn Church.

1608 - Kilmaurs Tower shown on Timothy Pont's map. No record of Kilmaurs Place.

1612 - John Monipennie stated that "Kilmaurs Tower" was the residence of the Earls of Glencairn, indicating that Kilmaurs Place had not yet been constructed.

1616 - William Cunningham conveys the 'manor place' to David Cunningham of Robertland.

1623 - The Glencairn Greit House built in Dumbarton High Street as the townhouse of the Earls of Glencairn.

1600 to 1649 - various suggested dates recorded for the construction of Kilmaurs Place. However see next entry.

1660 to 1664 - William Cunningham, 9th Earl, begins and then abandons construction of a substantial new building at Kilmaurs.

1685 - first recorded mention of "The Place" as noted in the "Caprington Retours" of that date.

1720 - Earl of Eglinton, purchases Kilmaurs Place from William Cunningham.

1751 - 1762 - Susanna, Dowager Countess of Eglinton, living at Kilmaurs Place.

1774 - 1784 - William Logan, factor of the Robertland Estate, living at Kilmaurs Place.

1786 - 14th Earl of Eglinton sells Kilmaurs Place to the Marchioness of Titchfield.

1788 - A Mr Hamilton of Bardowie dies at 'Kilmaurs House.' A relation of the Cunningham's he was permitted burial in the Glencairn Aisle vault.

1793 - Captain Ralston of Warwickhill, factor to the Earl of Eglinton, living at Kilmaurs Place.

1820 - Lady Montgomery Burgess, great grand-daughter of the 9th Earl of Eglinton, living at Kilmaurs Place.

1870 - James Wyllie and his wife Elizabeth, nee Muir lived at 'The Place'. James was the miller at nearby Kilmaurs Mill.

1877 - John Mackie and his wife Elizabeth, nee Dunlop lived at 'The Place'. John was the miller at Kilmaurs Mill.

1935 - In use as a farmhouse.

1956 - In use as a farmhouse.

=== Kilmaurs Place described ===
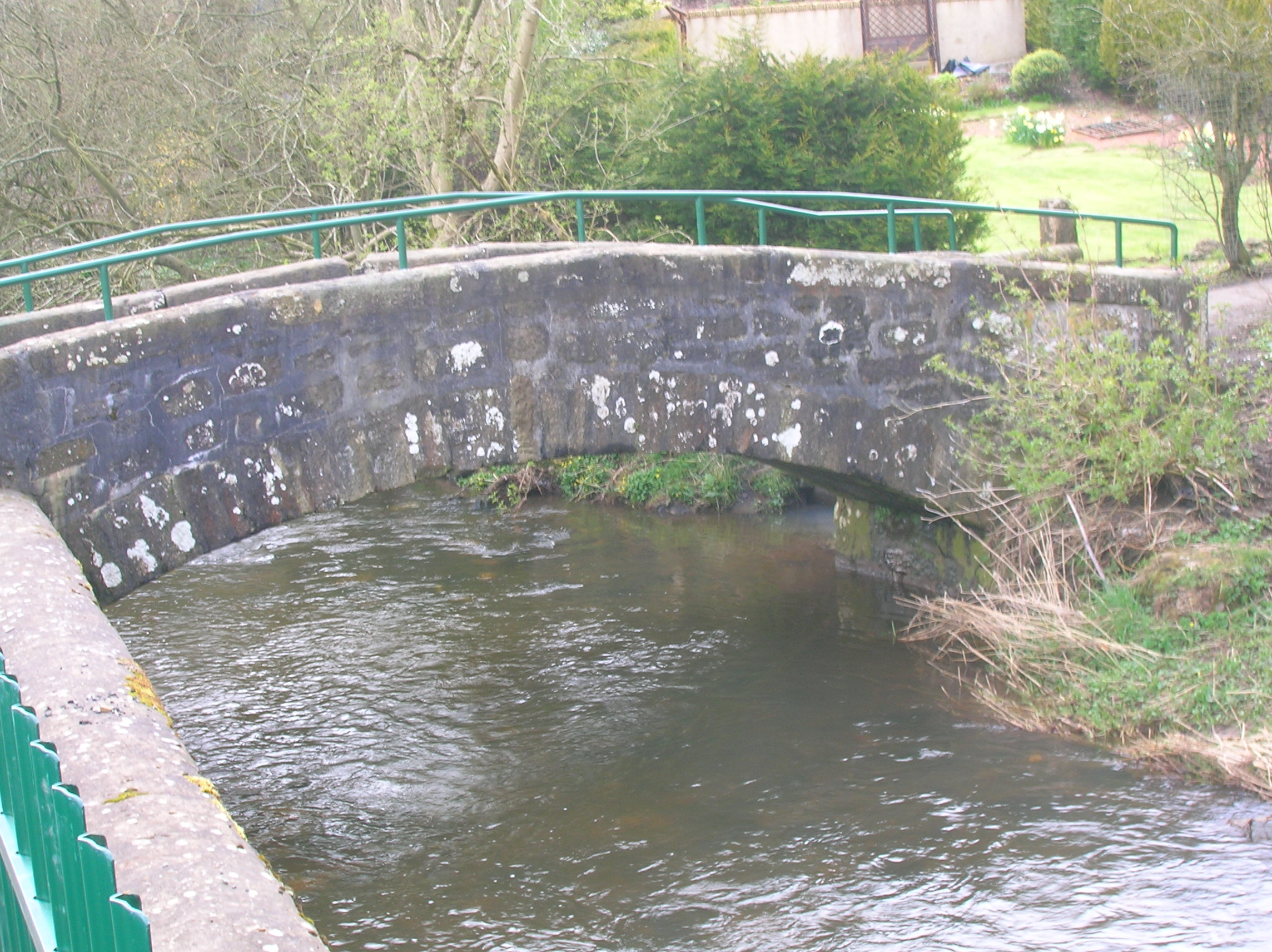
The Old Brig over the Carmel Water in the park below Kilmaurs Place.

The word 'Place' in Scots refers to a landed proprietor's mansion house, however in academic and practical terms it is a larger building which surrounds a central courtyard. This suggests that Kilmaurs Place was to have been a larger structure with a central courtyard and may indeed have had one as suggested by surviving walls, architectural features and drought induced lawn discolourations. The term 'Palace' only acquired its present connotations at a later date.

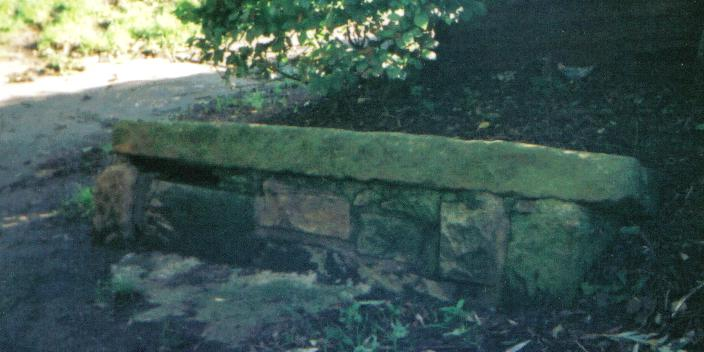
A view of the Monk's or Mack's Well below Kilmaurs Place.

The structure consists of a main block lying roughly east–west, with a stair-wing projecting in the centre of the West wall with crow step gabling. It has two stories and an attic, with 'modern buildings' forming the former farm outbuildings although the west facing gable end may be older.

In 1956 Kilmaurs Place is described as having been restored, and in use as a farmhouse. Kilmaurs Place was listed on 14 April 1971 as a Category B historic building.

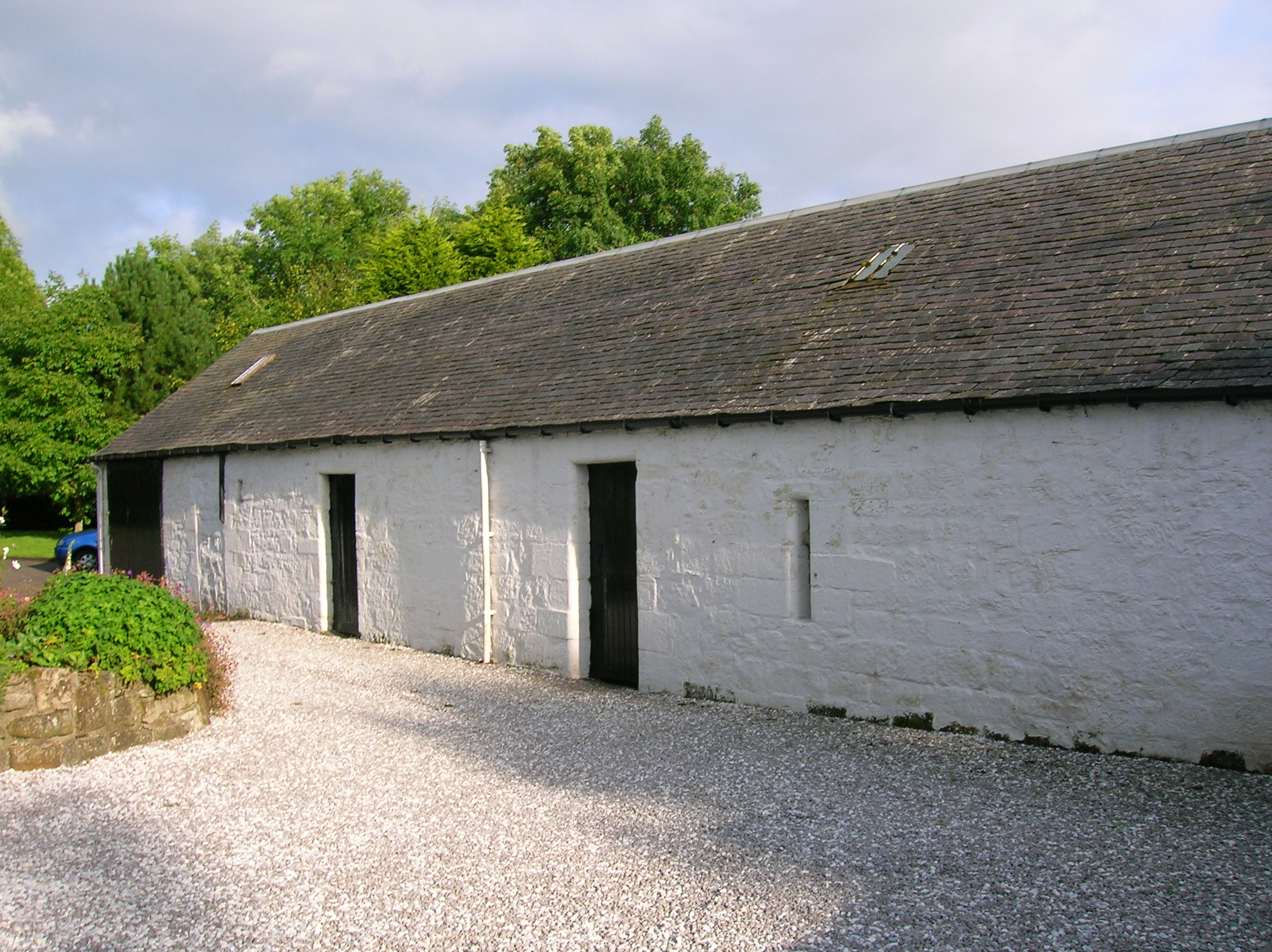
Outbuildings at Kilmaurs Place. The gable end may icorpotate part of the old courtyard or barmkin wall.

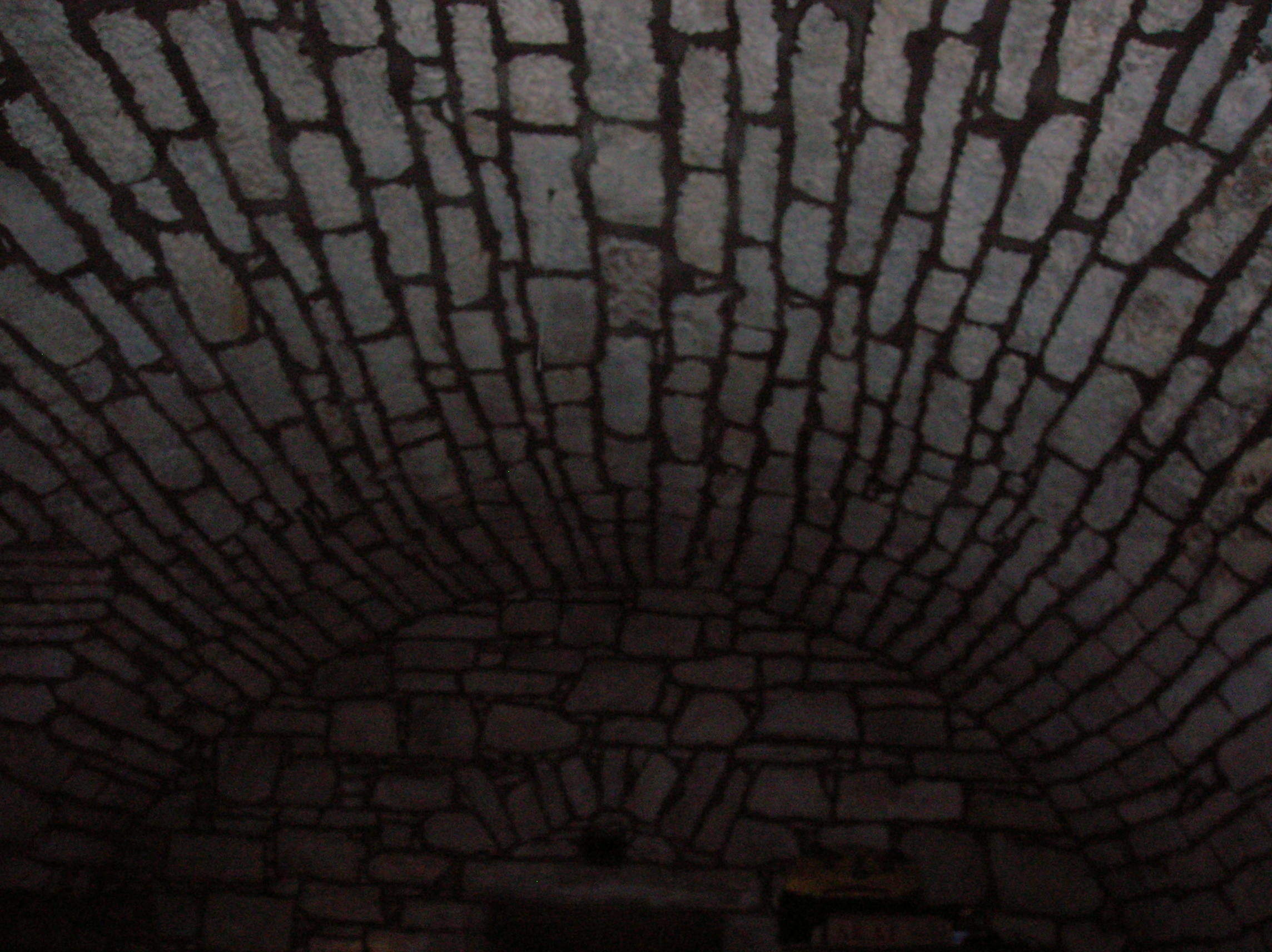
The vaulted Chancellor's study.

Davis records that the house has a 'T' plan and is dated circa 1620. The 'ruins' appear to be the incomplete lower floor of a 16th-century range. The Place itself is not vaulted, although the 'ruins' have a slate roofed vaulted chamber still in use by the present occupants and known as the Chancellor's Study. This chamber was in use as a milk house in the early 19th century. A fine 16th-century fireplace and carved jambs are located in the Place itself.

The original entrance was at the staircase projection, the door still being visible in the fabric of the building and an armorial panel above is still visible above. The windows have been much altered as have the floor levels within the building. Campbell comments on the possibility of Kilmaurs Place being built upon an older castle which is no longer evident. Tranter comments on the Garret in the steeply pitched roof and the chamfered surrounds on some of the windows. The house belongs to the very end of the defensive period. Close sees The Place as essentially being a new build on a new site and comments that the building has been much altered, most obviously by the 'slapping out' of additional windows. In the 1940s the house was described thus: 'The still remaining apartments are more like dungeons than living-rooms'. A watch room was located at the top of the staircase projection.

In 1912 the remains of an avenue opening on the Townend and leading circuitously to the old frontage could still be discerned in the field adjoining the main road; Cuthbertson records a few of these beech trees being present in 1945. The entrance off the Mill Vennel by a bridge over the Carmel Water, is said to have been formed when the frontage was changed.

The 1788–91 Eglinton estate plans of holdings in Kilmaurs show an entrance running straight up to The Place from near the bridge over the Carmel Water on the Kilmaurs Road; the formal pleasure gardens are illustrated as a square of three by three equal size squares with paths dividing them up. These gardens lay on the church side of the house, slightly offset towards Tour House. In 1945 the vaulted ruins were being used as stores for agricultural tools and such-like.

The bridge over the Carmel at Fenwick Road was built to provide an access when the front entrance was moved to the north facing side.

=== Kilmaurs Tower ruins and Place in 1912 ===
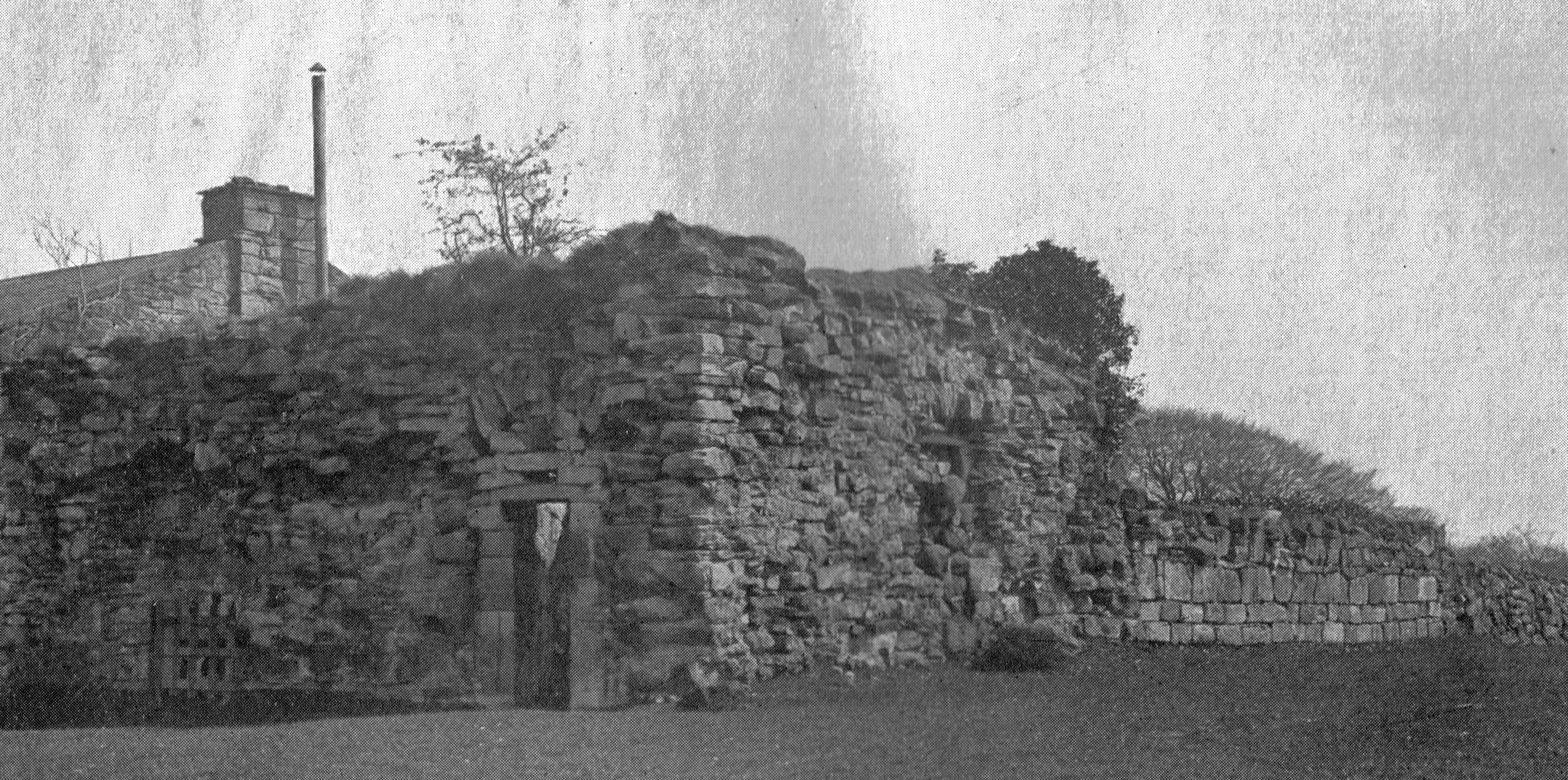
A section of the Kilmaurs Tower ruins.

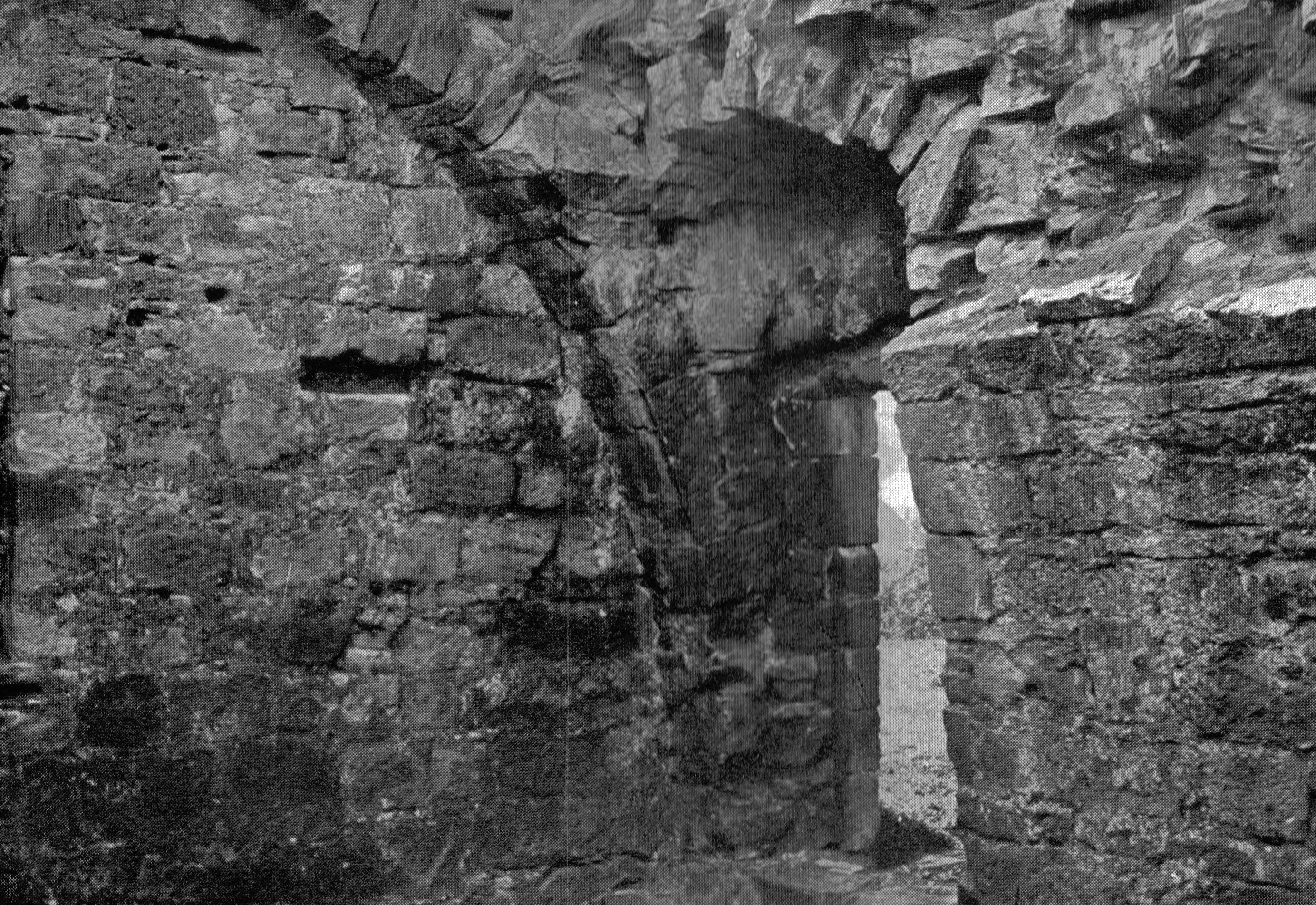
Internal details.

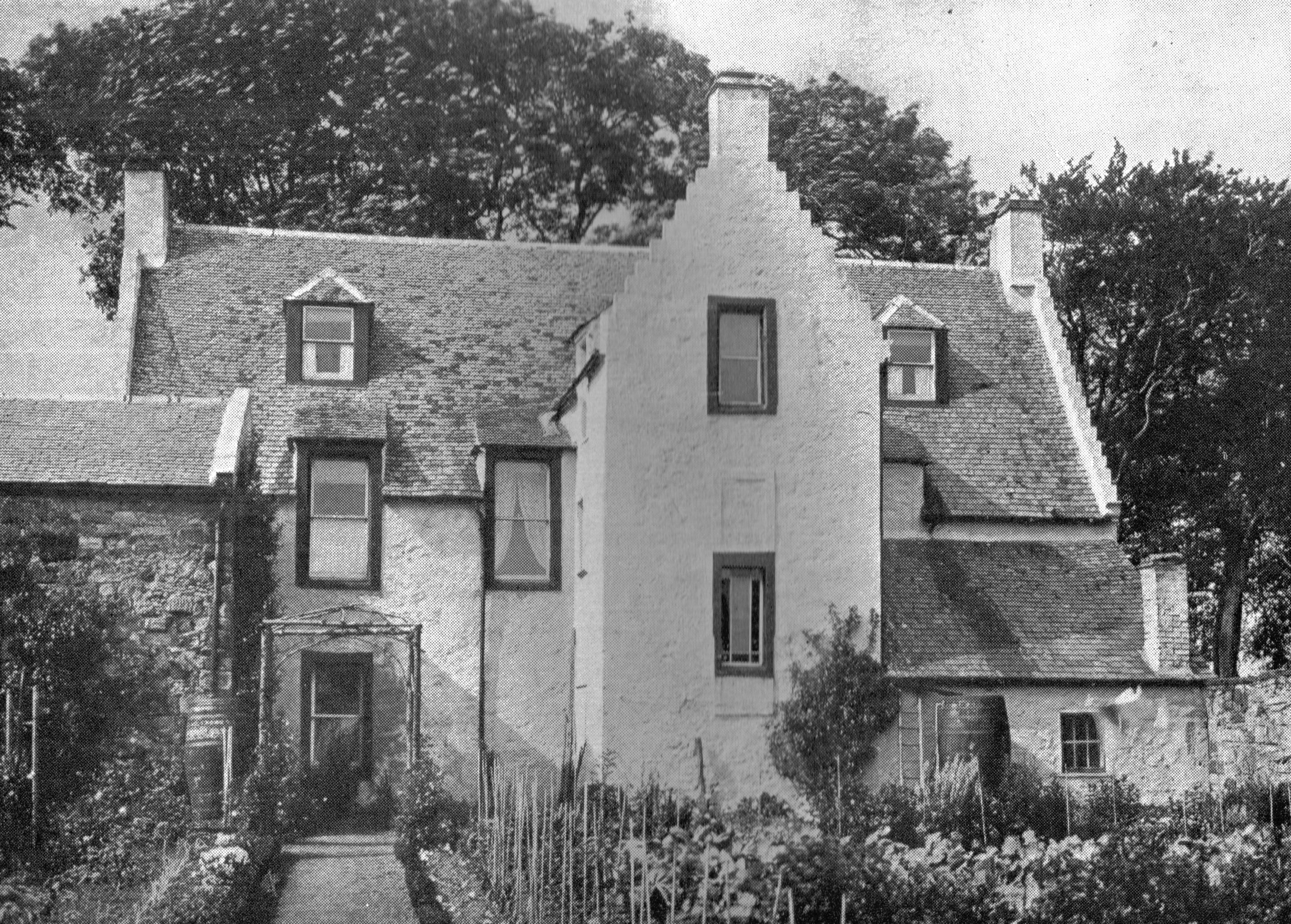
The Place from the South.

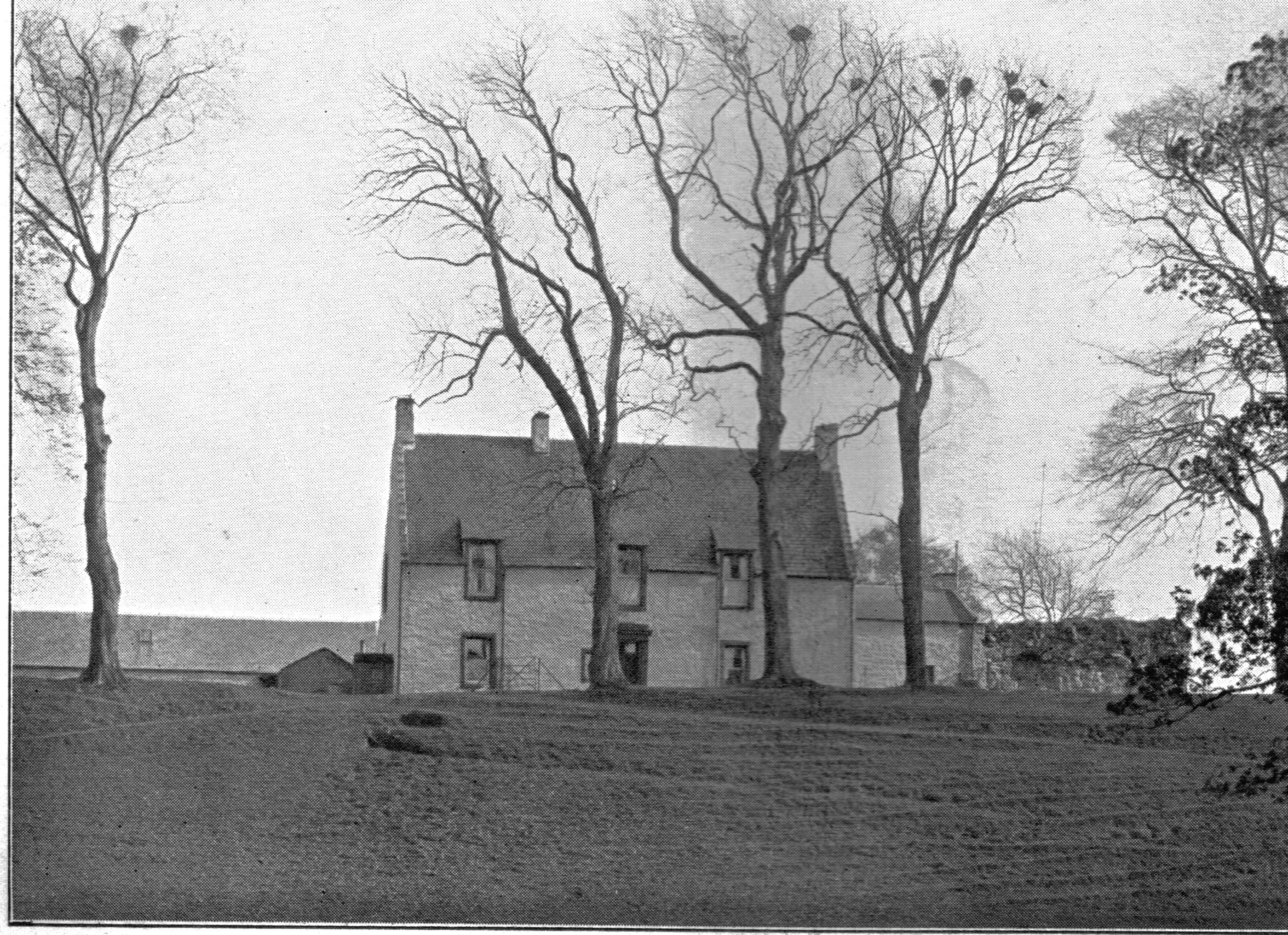
Kilmaurs Place from the park.

The reputed warlock, John Stewart, is said to have regularly met with the fairies on Kilmaurs Hill.

Latter day owners of Kilmaurs Place were the Tannock family who were threshing contractors and Mr Eric Anderson who ran a DIY shop in Kilmaurs Village.

=== Kilmaurs Place and surroundings in 2008 ===
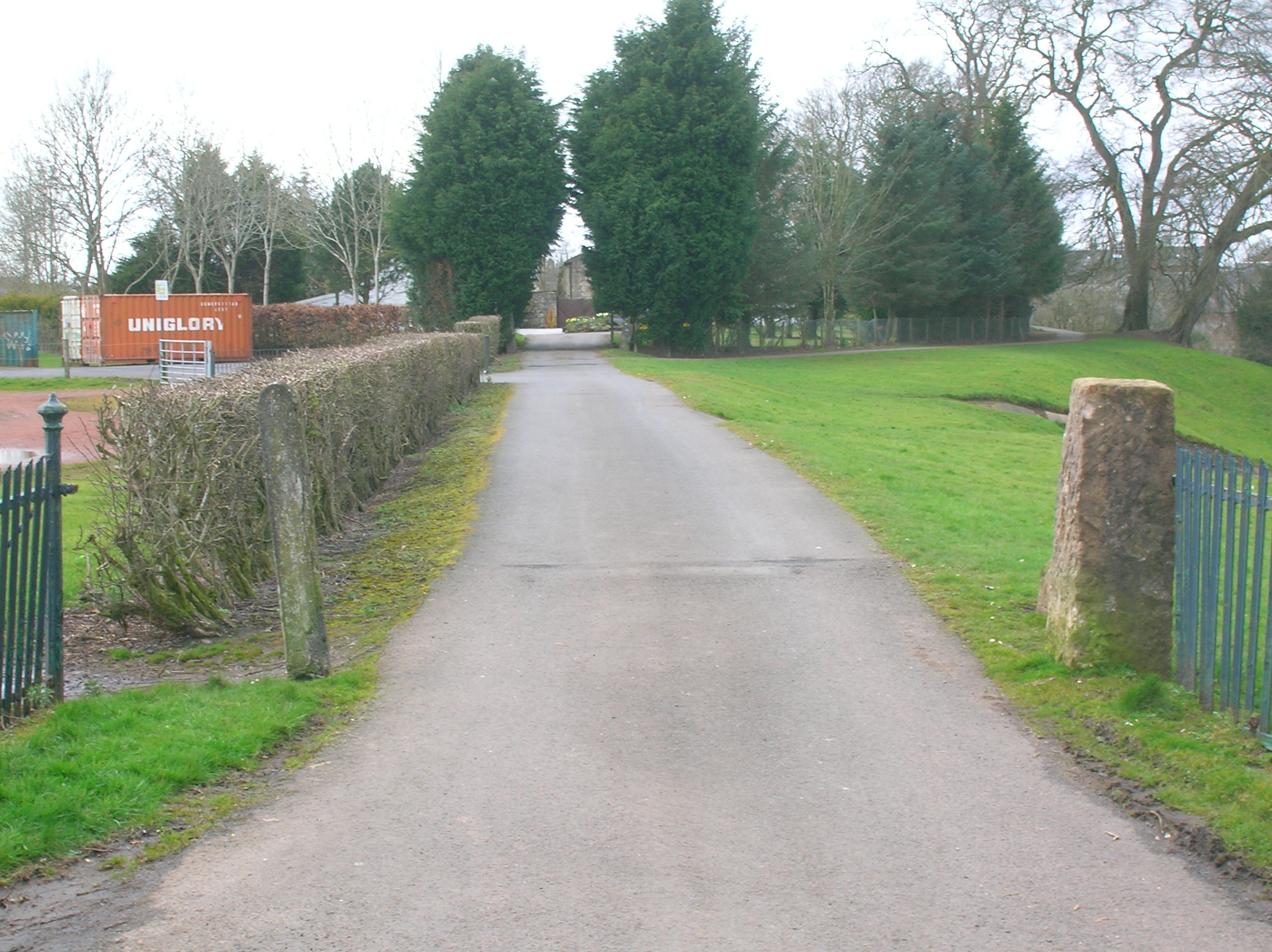
The Driveway leading to Kilmaurs Place.

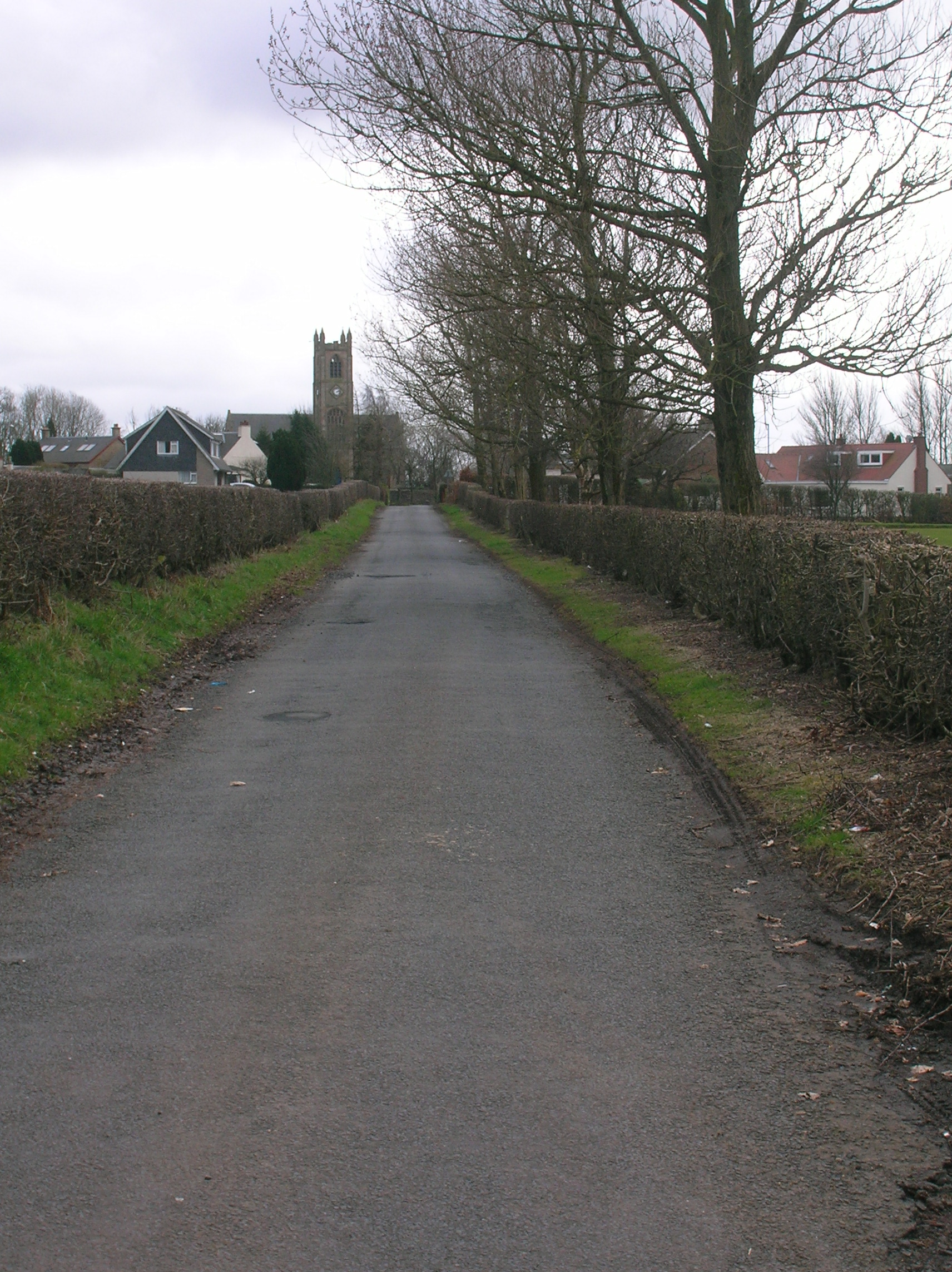
The Mill Vennel looking towards St. Maurs-Glencairn kirk.

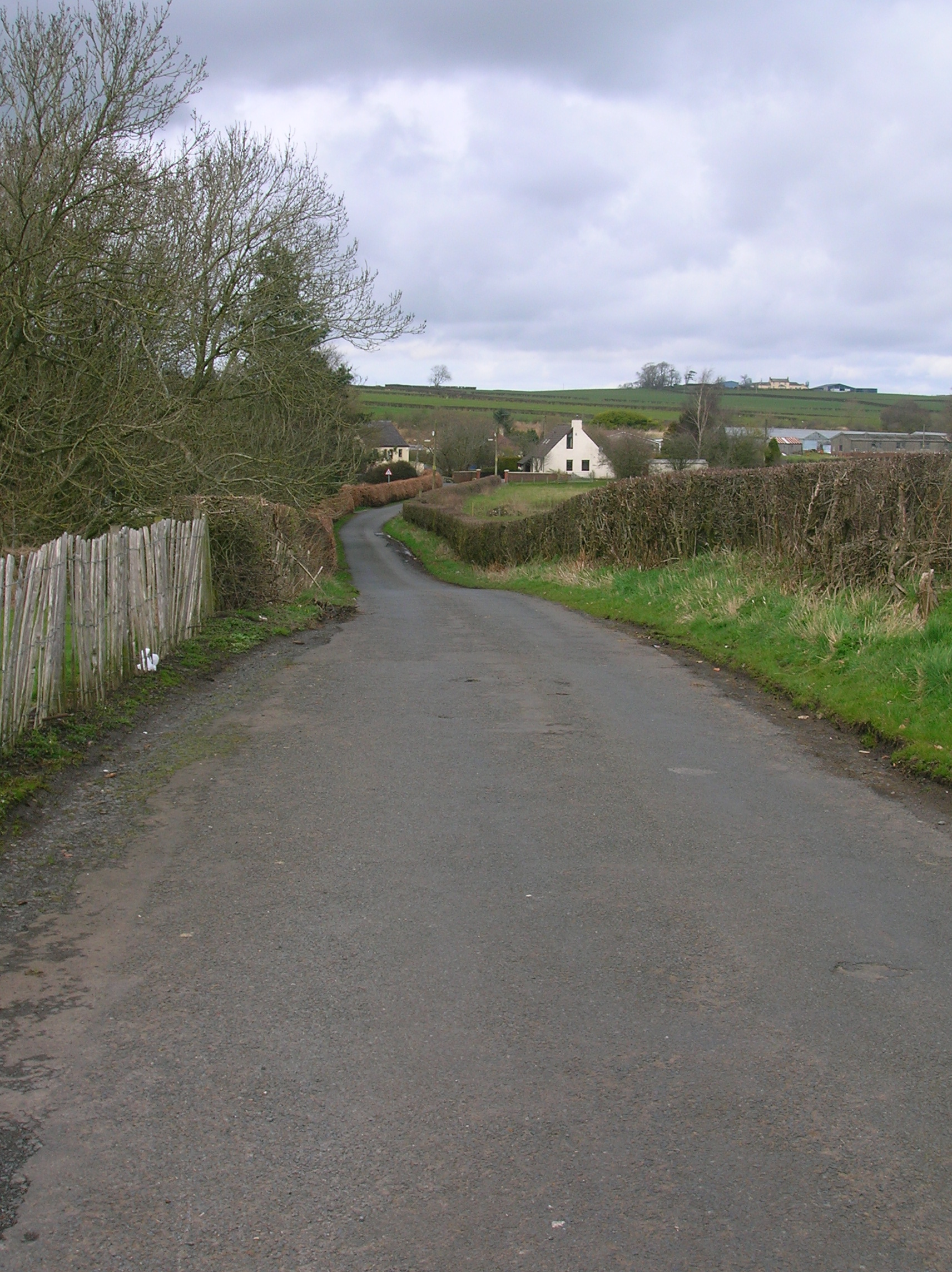
The Mill Vennel looking towards the Carmel Bridge.

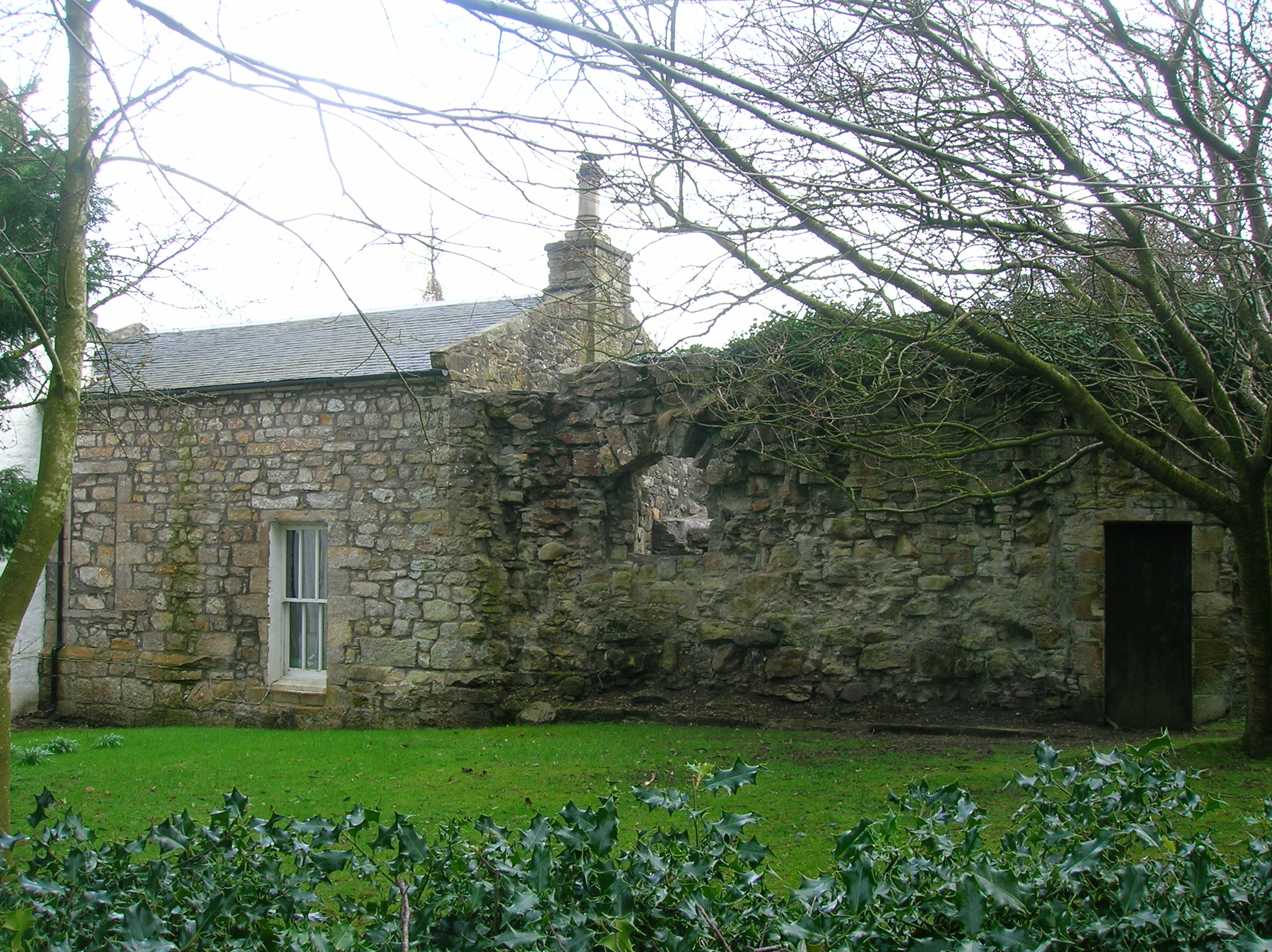
The 'ruins' and the vaulted chamber facing the park.
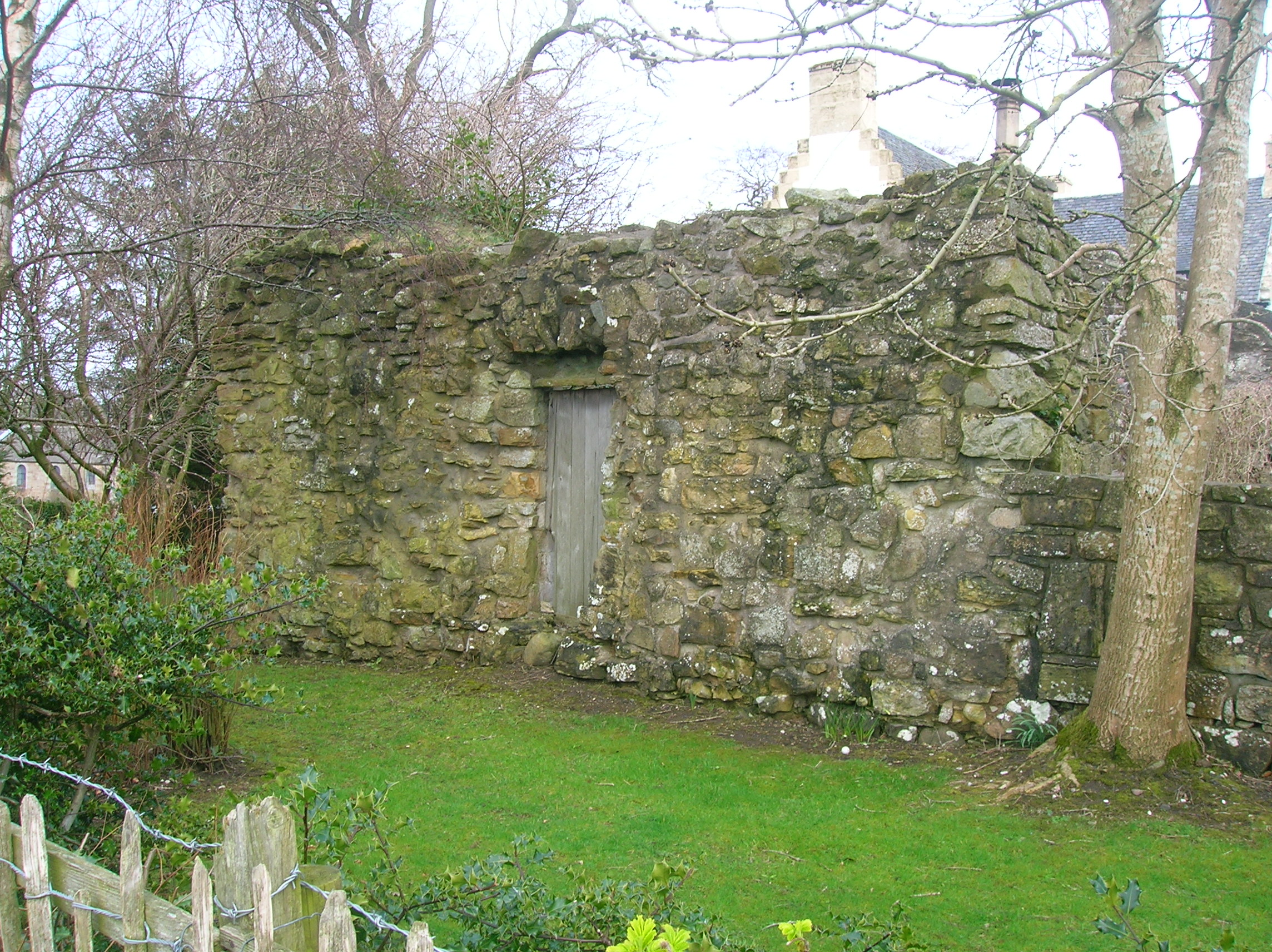
The 'ruins' facing the War Memorial.

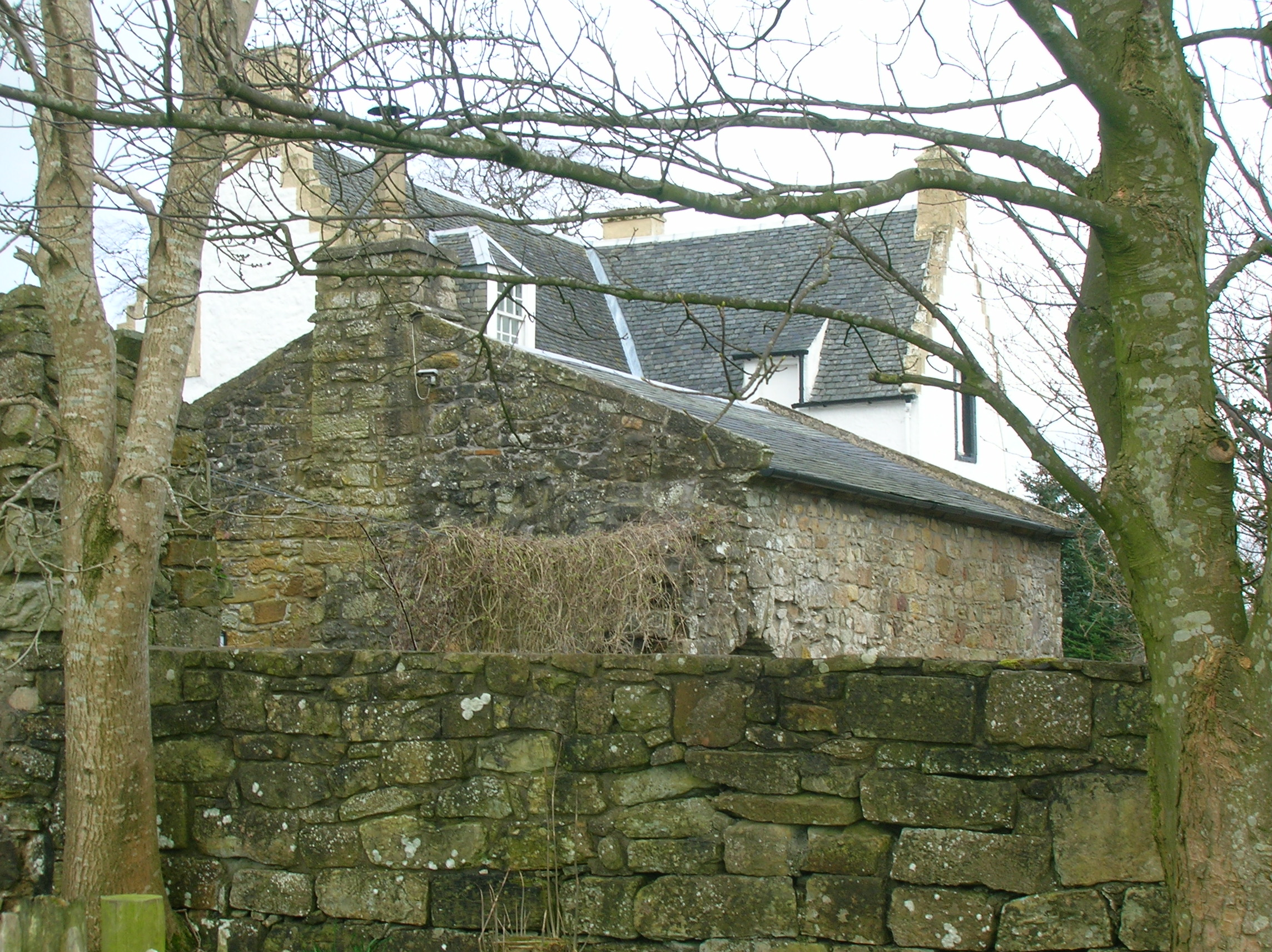
The vaulted chamber building with the 17th-century house in the background.

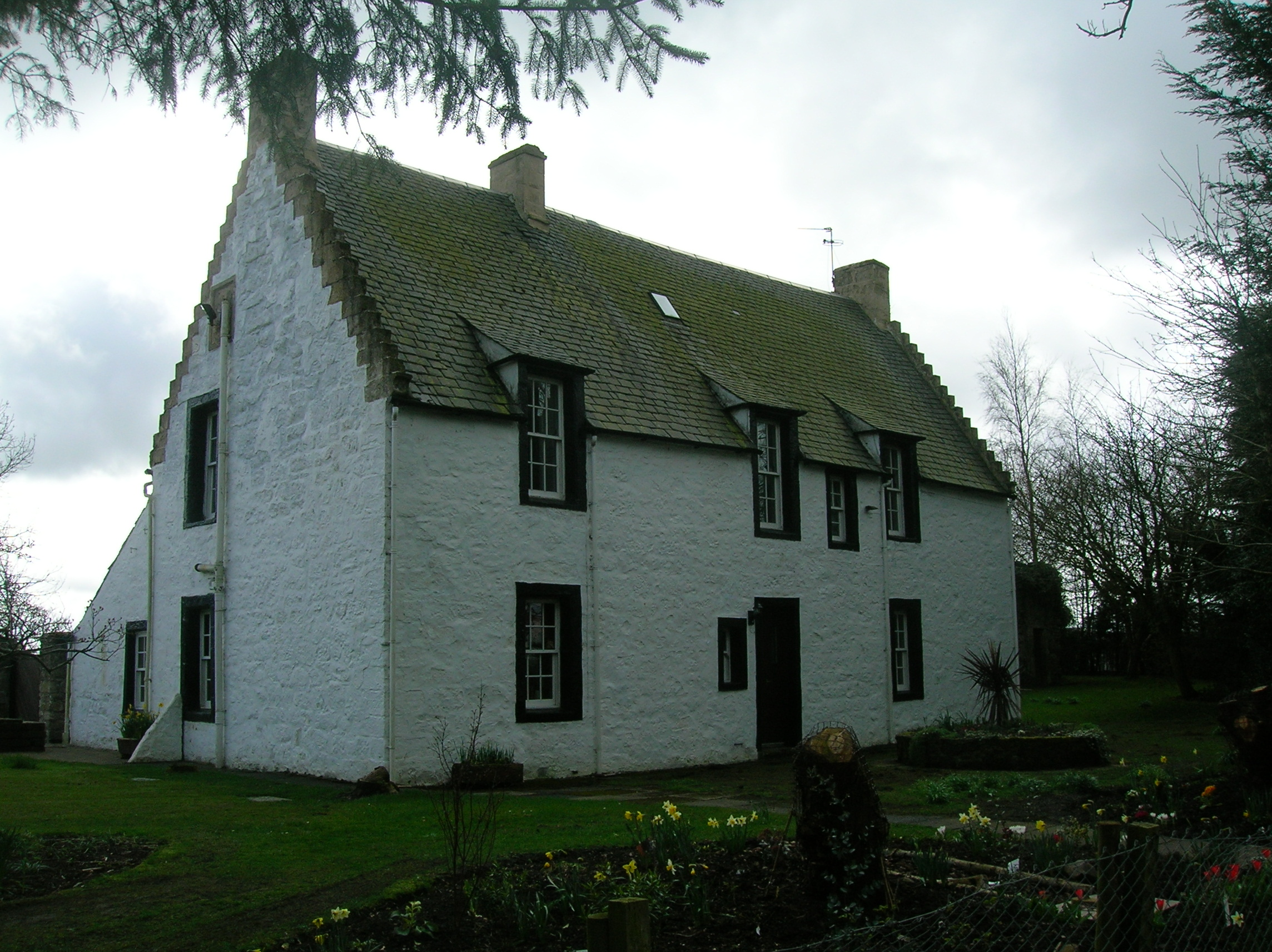
Kilmaurs Place facing the park.

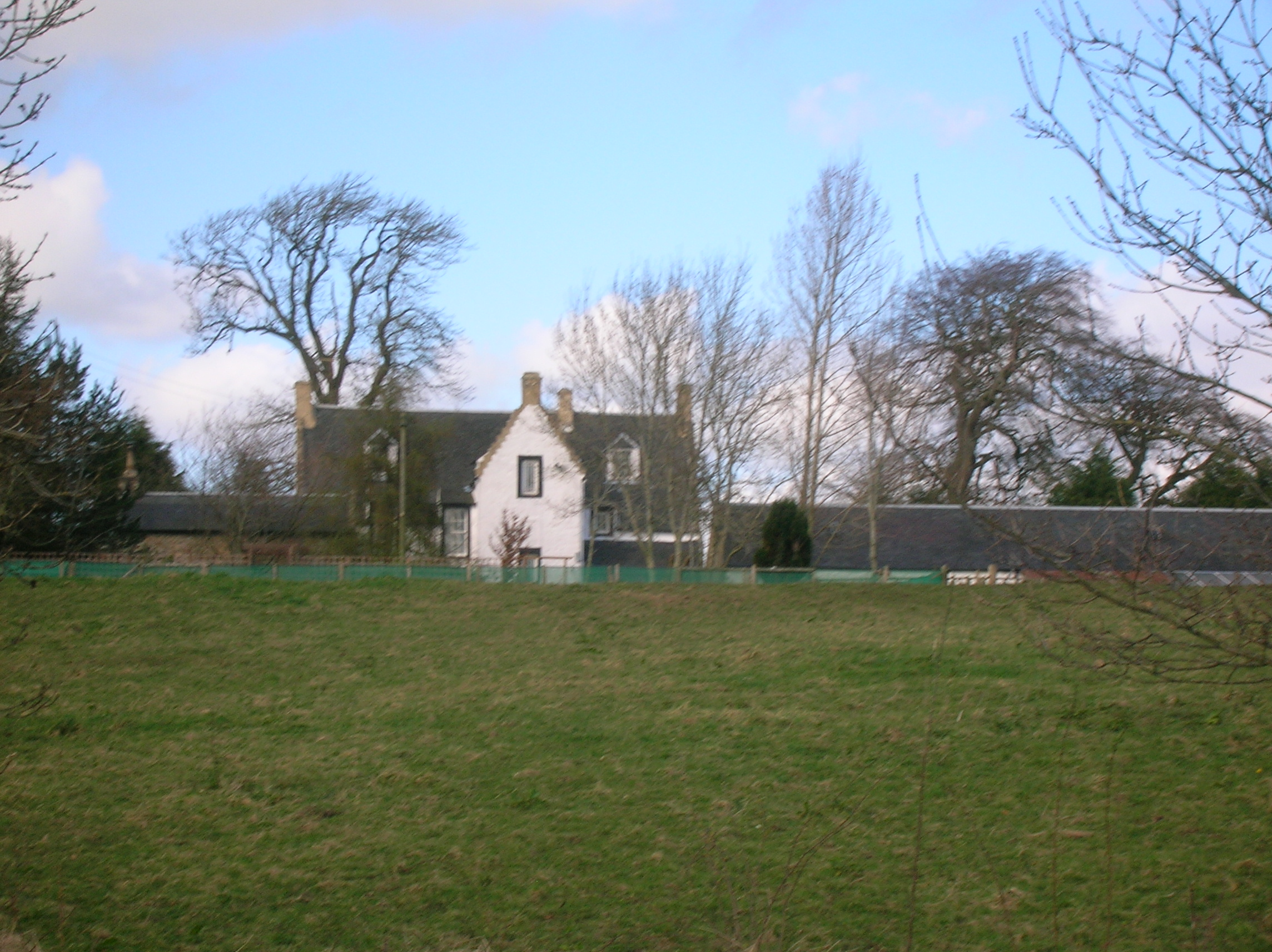
Kilmaurs Place from Townend.

==== The Gardens of Kilmaurs Place in 2009 ====
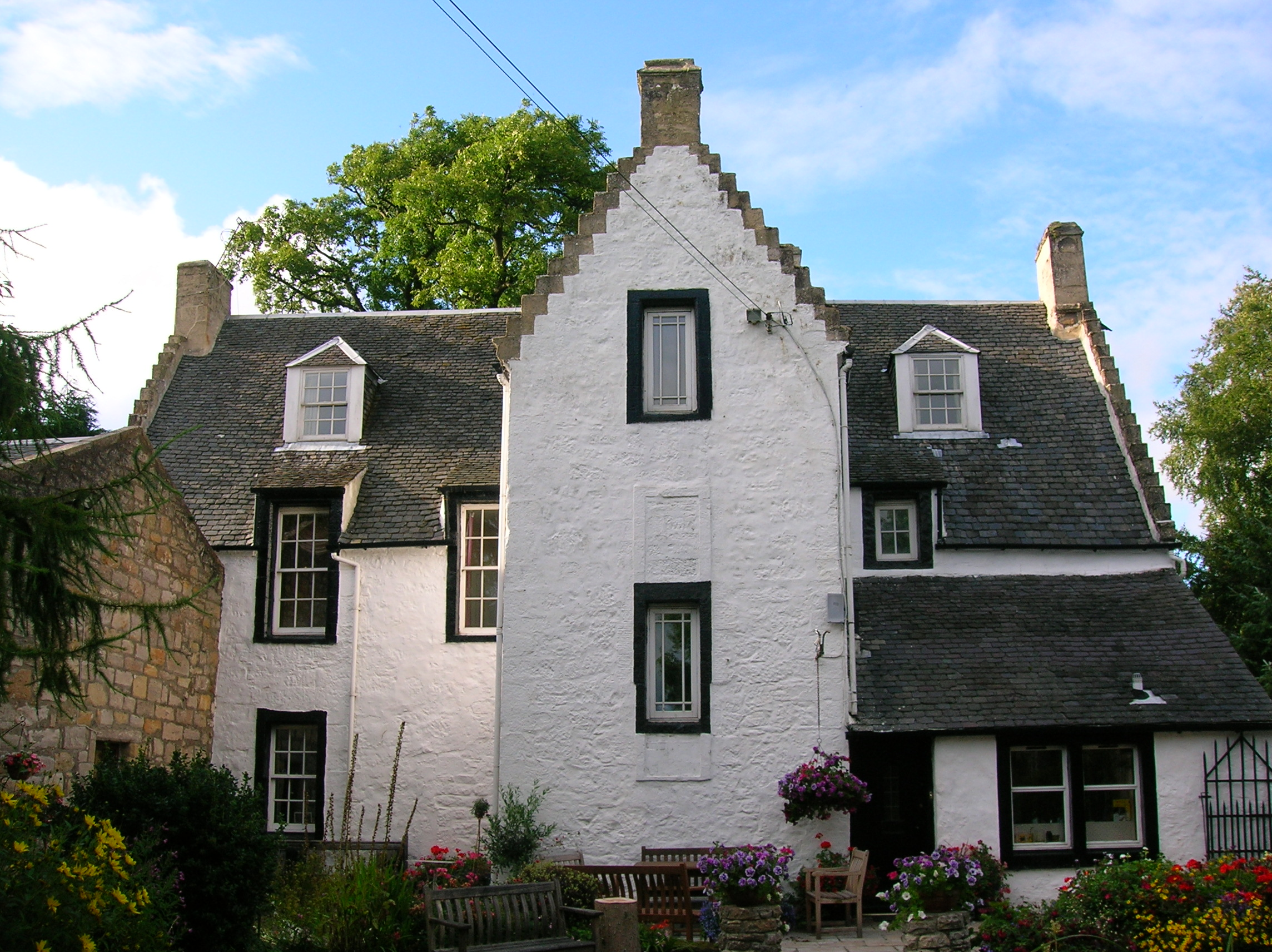
Front aspect of the house and garden.

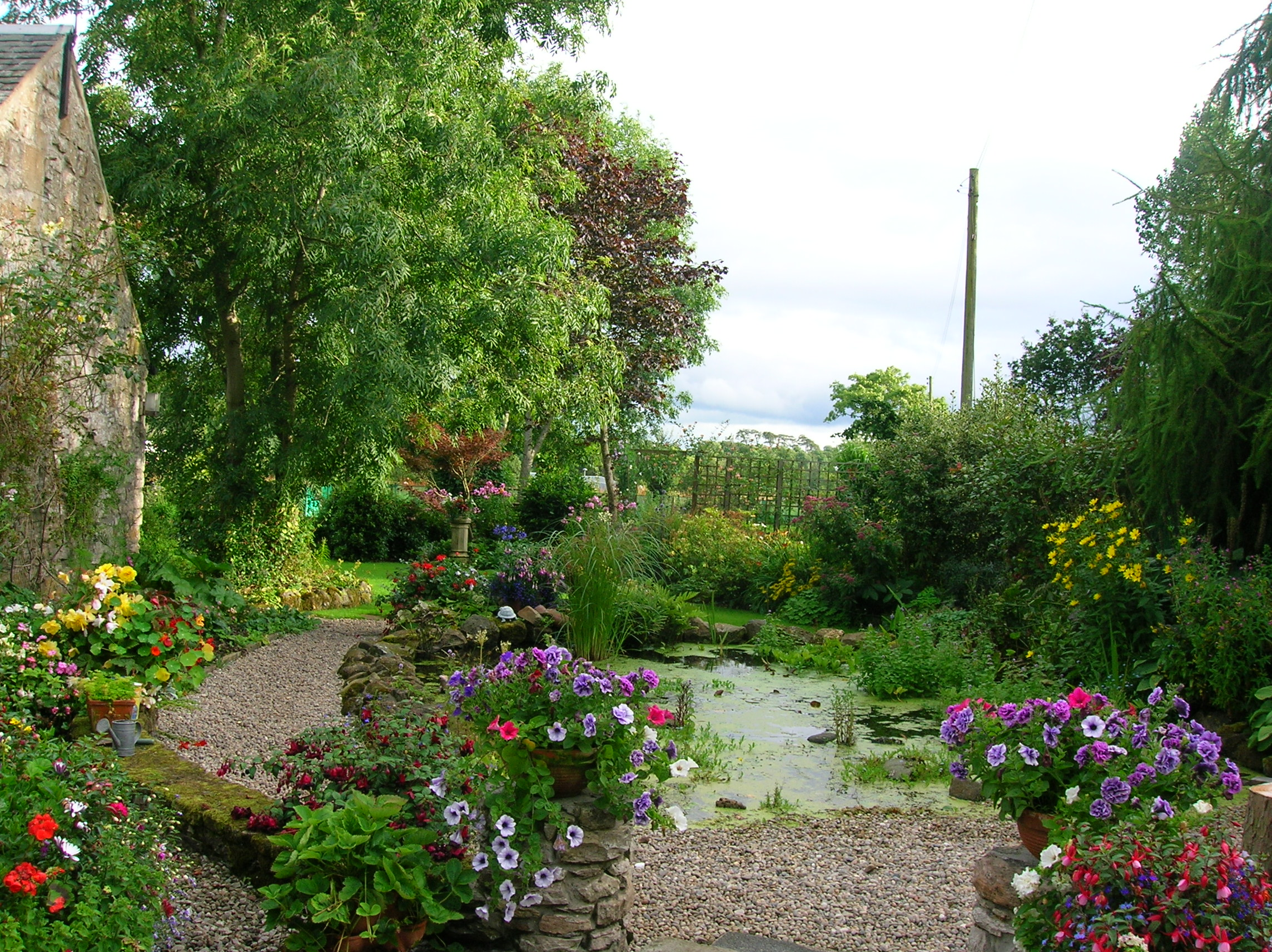
The main gardens in front of Kilmaurs Place.

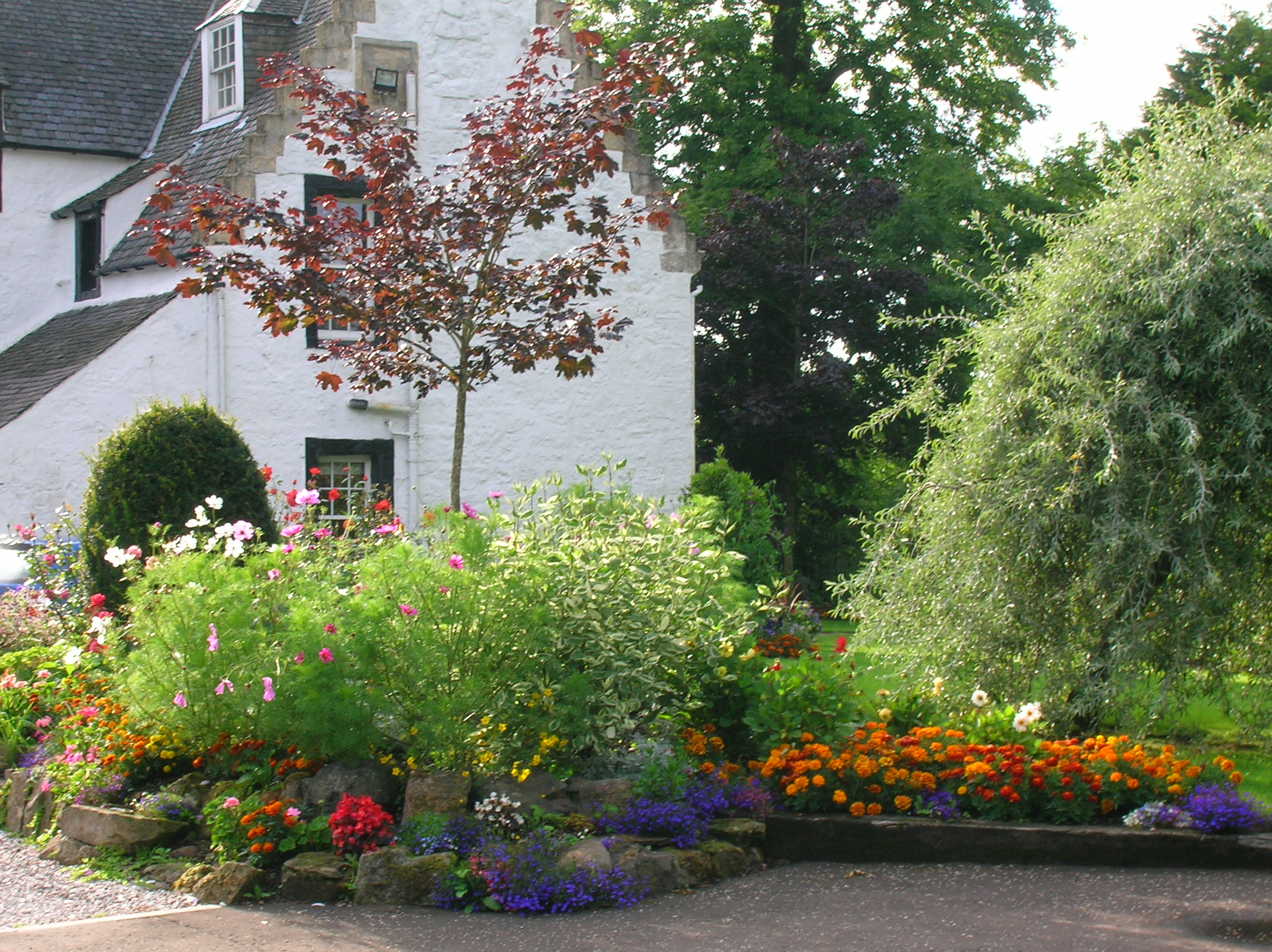
The gable end of the house and a garden feature.

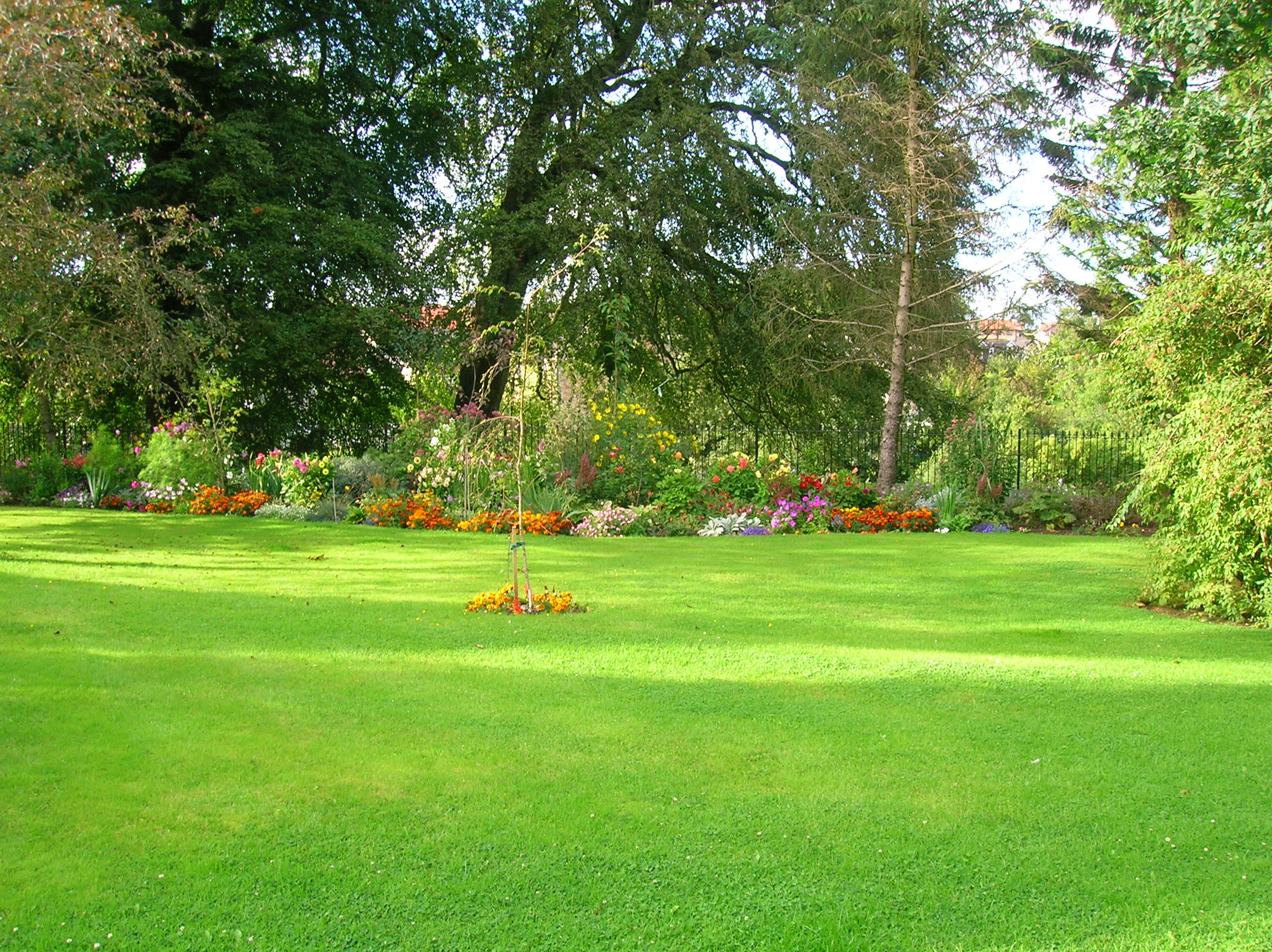
Lawns and flowerbeds at the driveway entrance.

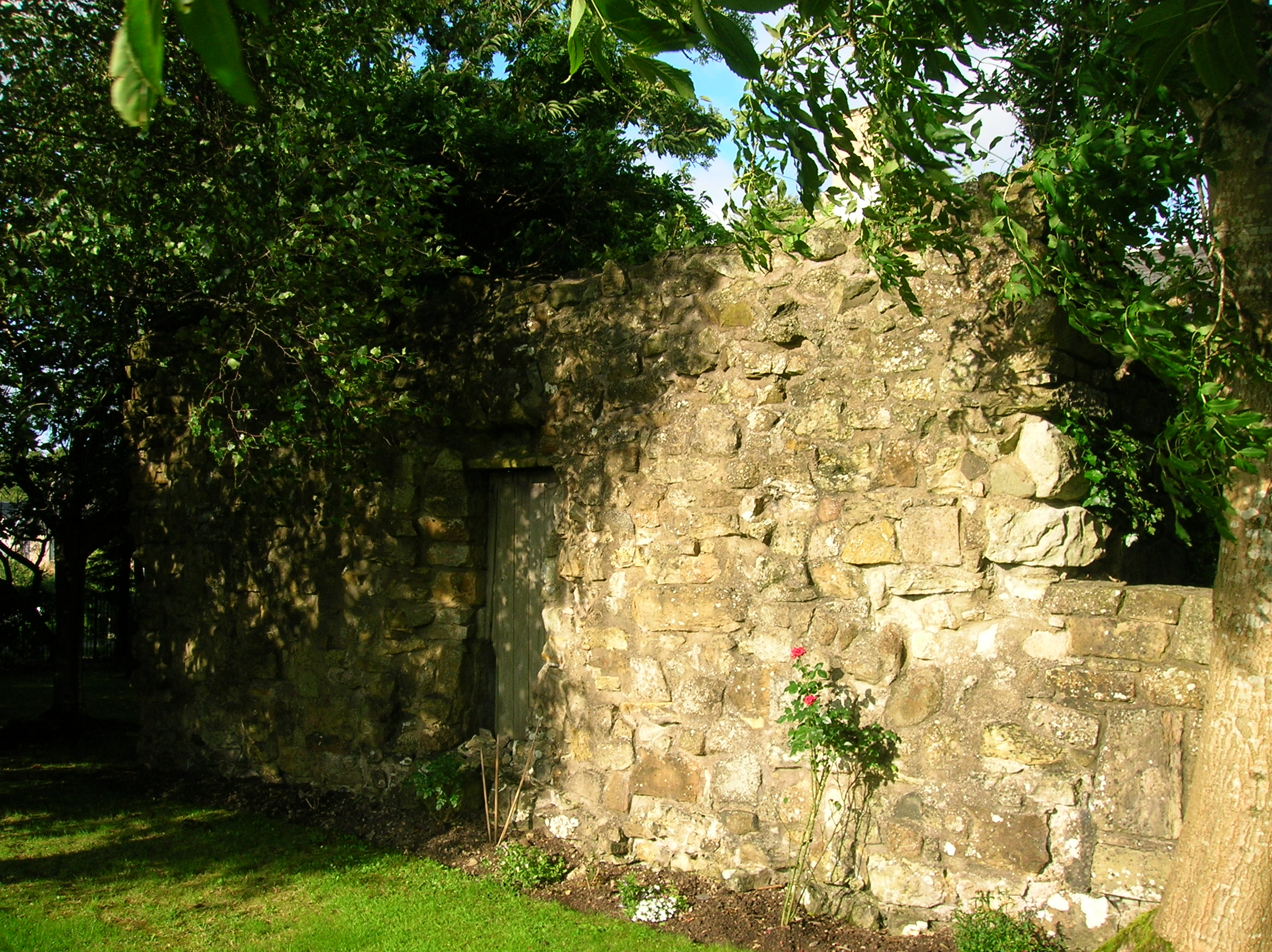
Part of the courtyard wall of Kilmaurs Place.

== Kilmaurs Castle ==
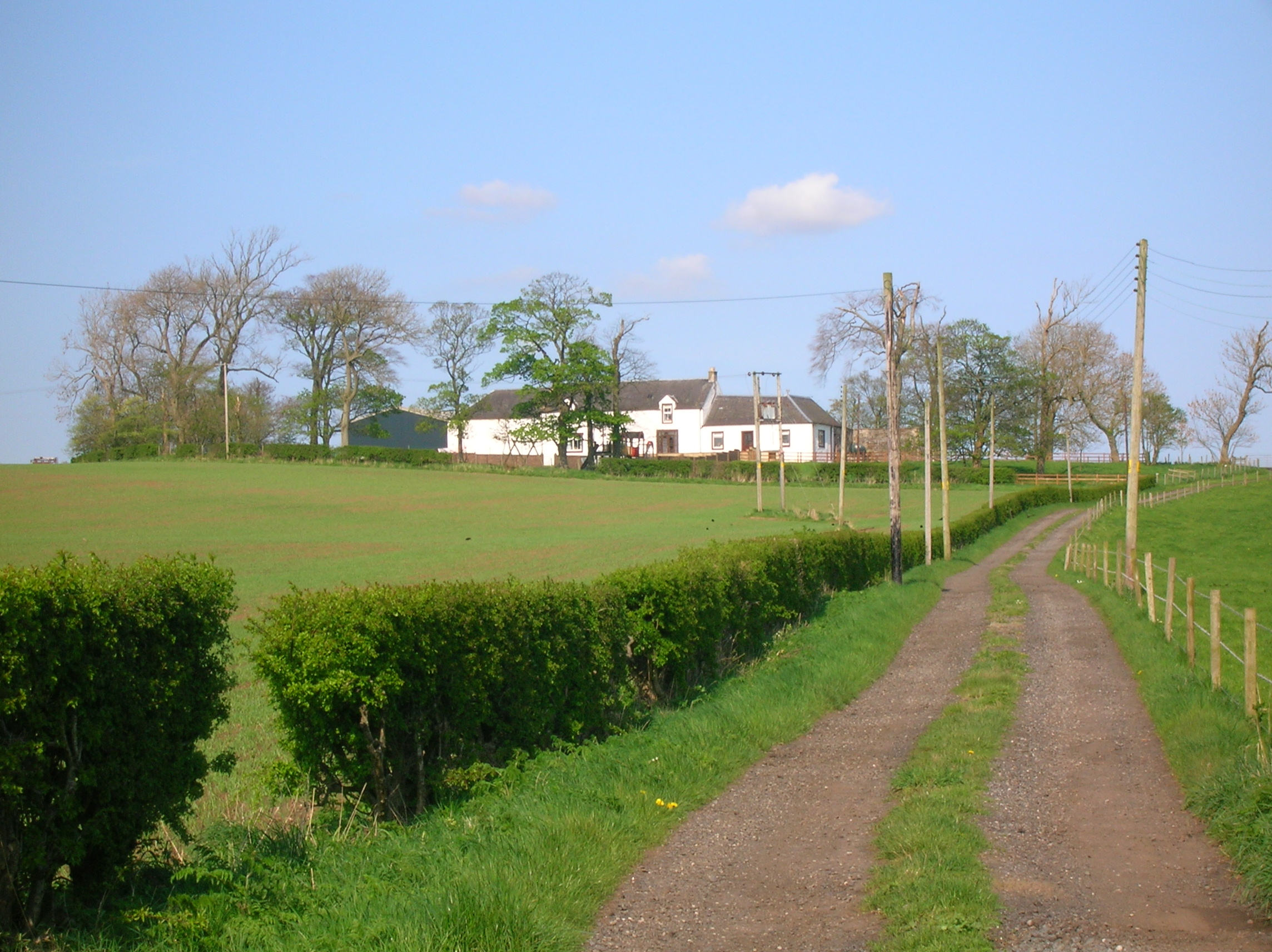
Jocksthorn Farm above Kilmaurs.

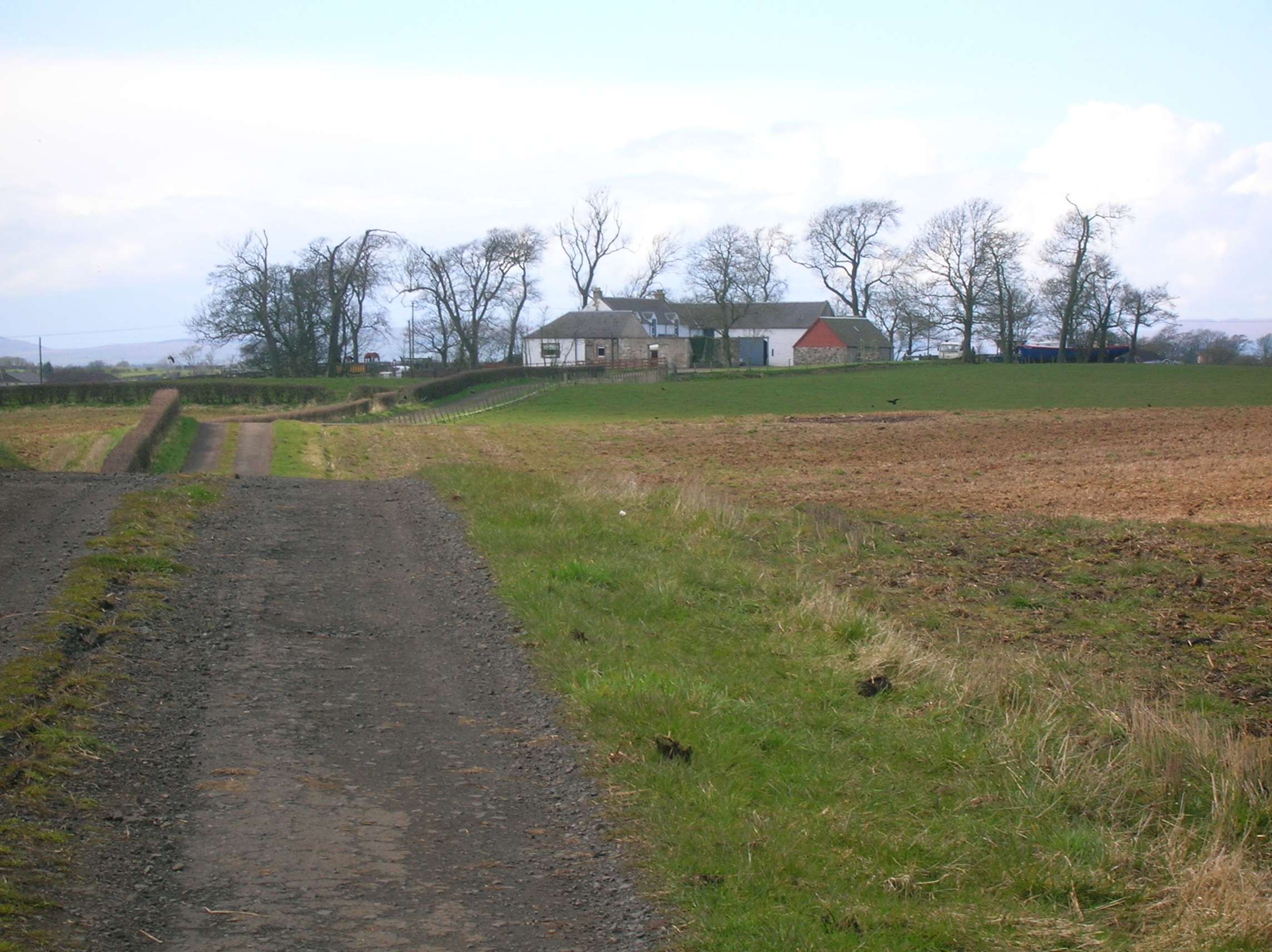
Jocksthorn Farm from the Kilmarnock facing side in the vicinity of the 'Old Castle.'

The Statistical Account of 1791-99 says of the Earl of Glencairn "that noble family then resided in this parifh, where they had a houfe, fome fmall ruins of which yet remain on the farm which is called Jock's-thorn, near to the road leading from Stewarton to Kilmarnock, ..."

Adamson relates in 1875 that the ancient castle was in the vicinity of Jock's or Jack's Thorn farm, and indeed several old people from Kilmaurs in 1875 remembered playing amongst the ruined remnants of masonry which occupied the site of this old castle of the Cunninghams. Metal detectorists have found medieval coins in this area amongst old unhewn building or foundation stones. The 19th-century 6 inch OS Map of Kilmaurs marks the supposed site of Kilmaurs Castle off the side of the farm road leading to Jocksthorn from the old Stewarton Road.

Dobie in 1874 that the old baronial residence was about a mile South-East of Kilmaurs and ruins could still be pointed out on the farm of Jock's Thorn. He goes on to say that this could have been the 'Villam de Cunninghame', the original residence and first possession of this ancient family. Lambroughton is another possible site.

Davis records that the local farmer has noted that pottery and stones are brought up by ploughing at an elevated spot (NS 417 411) off the old entrance to Jock's Thorn farm at a point East of both Tour and Jock's Thorn. Davis also notes that Cuthbert Cunninghame's family lived at Jocksthorn.

McNaught records that a charter of 1498 refers to "the Castle and Fortalice of the Barony and lands of Kilmaweris" (sic). The explanation for the Kilmaurs Place / Jock's Thorn locations of Kilmaurs Castle is that the prime location for a castle was on the eminence now occupied by Kilmaurs Place and this was the baronial residence, whilst Jock's Thorn was a separate defensive structure, a fortalice, usually more a place for the protection of the common people than a residence for the laird. Stewarton shows this situation with Corsehill Castle as the manorial residence and the Templehouse fortalice as the place for the protection of the tenantry.

== The Kilmaurs Case ==
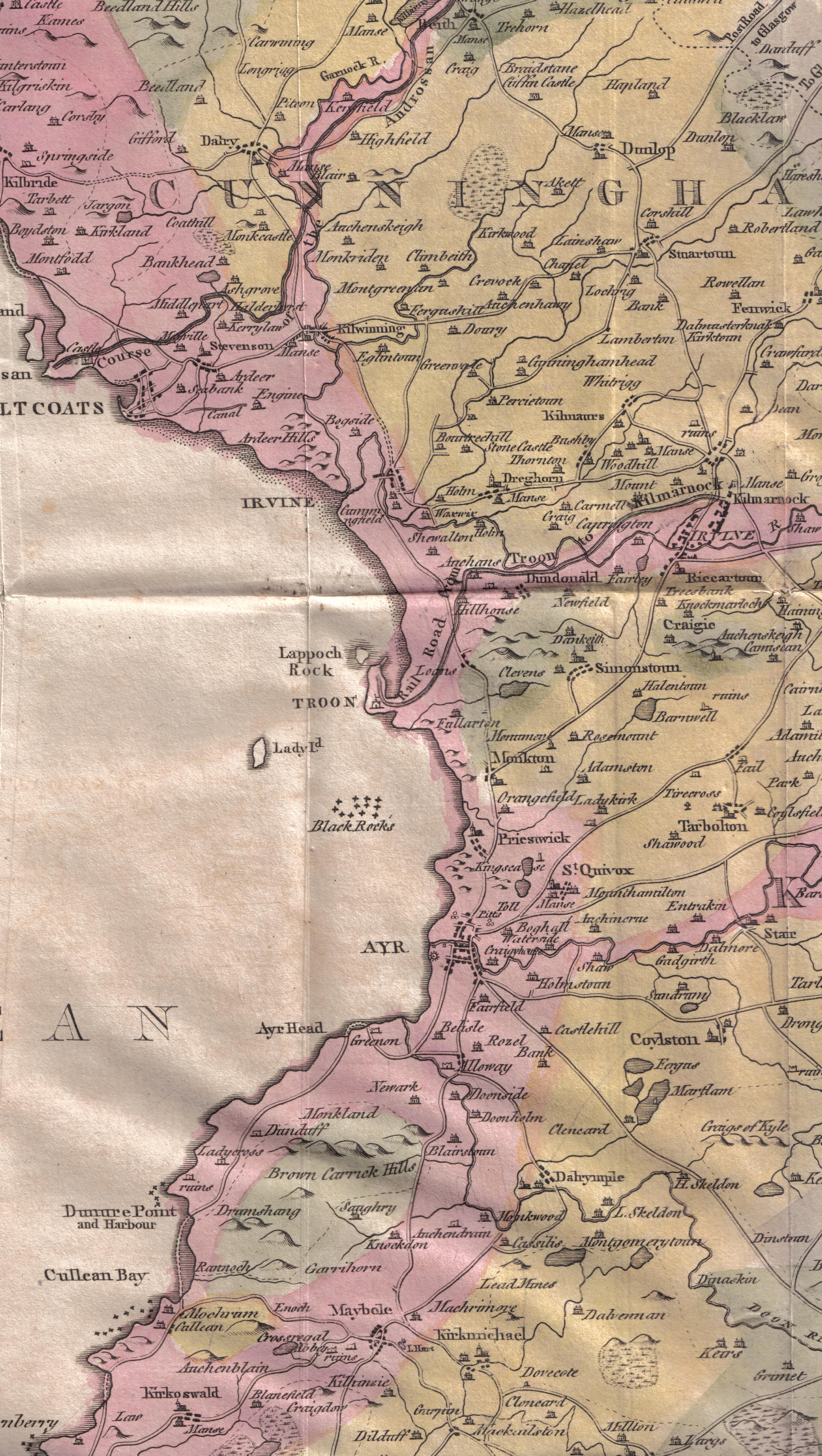
William Aiton's map of 1811 showing the ruins of Kilmaurs Castle near Jocksthorn.

The Kilmaurs Case involved the Reverend Alexander Inglis, minister of Kilmaurs Parish who was accused in 1885 of behaving inappropriately towards Elizabeth Mackie, nee Dunlop, the 36 year old wife of the Kilmaurs miller, John Mackie. The events covered the years 1876 to 1884. At first Quarry House near Kilmaurs Mill was the scene of the accusations, however by late 1877 the couple had moved to Kilmaurs Place. Elizabeth informed her husband of the minister’s approaches and reluctantly they both wrote letters asking the Rev Inglis not to call upon them and to desist. Eventually John felt it necessary to employ a Mr Alexander Morton, a private detective, and in due course a trap was set with the detective hiding in a press or wardrobe in a room occupied also by Elizabeth, into which the minister entered and upon his inappropriate behaviour taking place the detective revealed himself. The shocked minister threatened suicide and begged for mercy, eventually signing a letter of resignation. Later however the minister denied his inappropriate actions and stated that he had been forced to sign the letter under duress.

The case was placed before the Presbytery of Ayr and the minister was suspended. After due process the Presbytery found him guilty on three counts, however he appealed to the Synod who reversed the decision of the Presbytery, who then took it to the General Assembly of the Church of Scotland and here the minister was found not proven on all counts and he was reinstated. It was requested that all the evidence put before the assembly should be cremated due to the salacious nature of the accusations. A meeting was held by mainly the menfolk of Kilmaurs and the result was a finding of a miscarriage of justice and the Presbytery were thanked for their involvement.

== The Barony of Kilmaurs ==
The Barony of Kilmaurs was composed of the lands of Buston (now Buiston), Fleuris (now Floors), Lambroughton, Whyrrig, now Wheatrig and previously Quhytrige, and Southwick or Southuck (now South Hook). South Hook (previously also Southeuck or Seurnbenck) is near Knockentiber and was part of the tenement of Lambroughton within the barony.

== Kilmaurs Barony mill ==
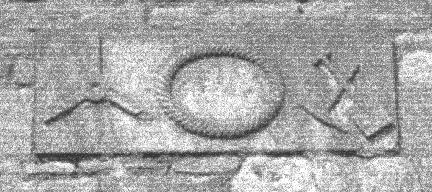
The stone that was set in the old mill wall; decorated with mill rynd, bill for dressing stones, and corn shovel flanking a rope-surrounded date.

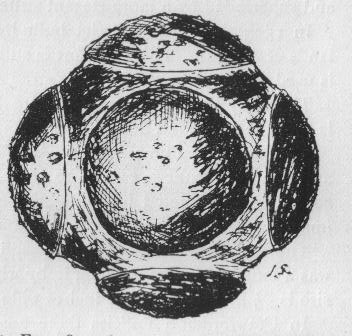
Carved stone ball petrosphere found at Jock's Thorn farm in the 19th century.

The mill was demolished in the late 1980s after a large bulge appeared in the outer wall in an area with rough rubble masonry, probably from the earlier mill; it was early-19th-century in date and was built by the Earl of Eglinton on an old mill site. It was a large 3-storey and attic, 6-bay rubble building, on a T-plan, with a kiln with roof-ridge ventilator at one end for drying grain. The kiln (was ast used in 1946 and consisted of a firebox burning smokeless anthracite or coke below an inverted flue; the heat was directed up to the perforated cast-iron tiles of the drying floor. The floor collapsed in 1964 whilst the area was being used to store barley and the miller, who was standing on the floor at the time, had to be rescued by the local fire brigade through a hole made in the kiln wall. There was an internal overshot wheel. The mill worked until 1966. In 1985 it was regarded as being probably the last complete example of a lowland Scottish large estate mill.

In 1870 James Wyllie, the miller, and his wife Elizabeth, nee Muir lived at 'The Place'. In 1877 John Mackie and his wife Elizabeth, nee Dunlop lived at 'The Place', John having become the miller.

During the 20th century a turbine, an oil engine, a vertical steam engine, and finally an electric engine were installed in turn; the waterwheel was abandoned. The first-floor loading door had a hinged chute for sliding sacks into lorries.

The millstones were supported on a cast iron cradle and below this were the belt-drives which transferred power from the waterwheel/motors to the stones. Five pairs of millstones were present. The 19th-century mill was used initially for grinding oats, and later for crushing peas and beans for use in animal feeds.

Every barony had a thirled mill held by the laird which his tenant farmers had to use, and the nearby Kilmaurs Mill on the Carmel Water dated back to at least the early 17th century as shown by old maps of the area. A mill on the site of old Kilmaurs Mill may therefore have been the one directly associated with the laird at the Place. An unusual feature of this old mill was a carved stone showing a millstone drive spider or rind (often used on Miller's tombstones as a symbol of the milling trade) on which the upper grindstone rested, a ring of rope, a bill for dressing millstones, and a grain shovel. This stone still survives at the site of the old mill, built into a wall.

Local names such as 'Ladeside' recall the mill. The old lade, much of its course still evident, took its water from the Carmel Water close to the road junction onto the Old Stewarton Road. The remains of the old mill pond dam are still visible (2008), but the pond itself has long been filled in on the site that became a plant nursery at Millholm.

== See also ==
- Kilmaurs Castle
- Lands of Tour and Kirkland
