= The Garreteer's Petition =

Painting by J. M. W. Turner

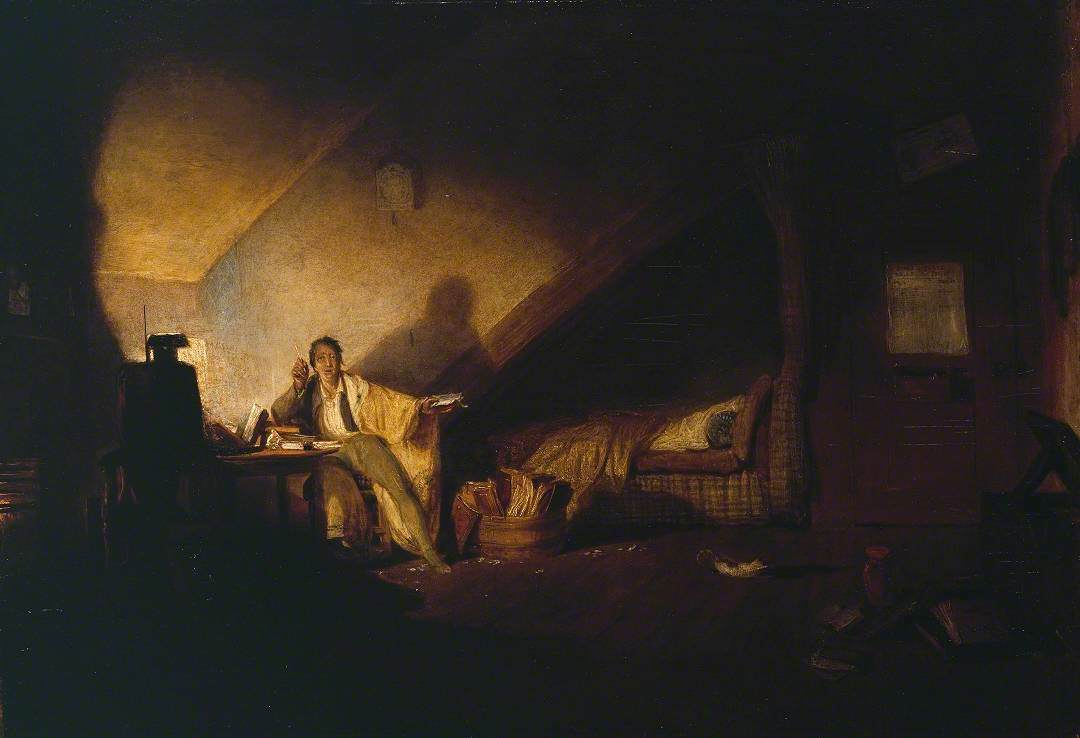
- Artist: J. M. W. Turner
- Year: 1809
- Type: Oil on canvas, genre painting
- Dimensions: 55.2 cm × 79.1 cm (21.7 in × 31.1 in)
- Location: Tate Britain, London
- Website: /www.tate.org.uk/...n00482

The Garreteer's Petition is an 1809 genre painting by the British artist J. M. W. Turner. It depicts a struggling young poet in his garret at night. On the wall is an image of Mount Parnassus, the mythological home of the Muses. The work is a parody of the popular image of a struggling young artistic type.

It was arguably part of a long-standing rivalry between Turner and the emerging painter David Wilkie, who had made his name as a genre painter. Turner had produced works that appeared to parody Wilkie's style. Turner gave up painting genre scenes after a few years, but other artists such as William Mulready built their careers on it.

It was shown at the Royal Academy's 1809 Summer Exhibition at Somerset House. Today it is in the collection of the Tate Britain in London, having been part of the Turner Bequest of 1856.

== See also ==
- List of paintings by J. M. W. Turner

== Bibliography ==
- Bailey, Anthony. J.M.W. Turner: Standing in the Sun. Tate Enterprises Ltd, 2013.
- Hamilton, James. Turner - A Life. Sceptre, 1998.
- Heffernan, James A. Visual Art and Verbal Interventions. Baylor University Press, 2016.
- Tromans, Nicholas. David Wilkie: The People's Painter. Edinburgh University Press, 2007.
