= Garret =

Small attic used as apartment

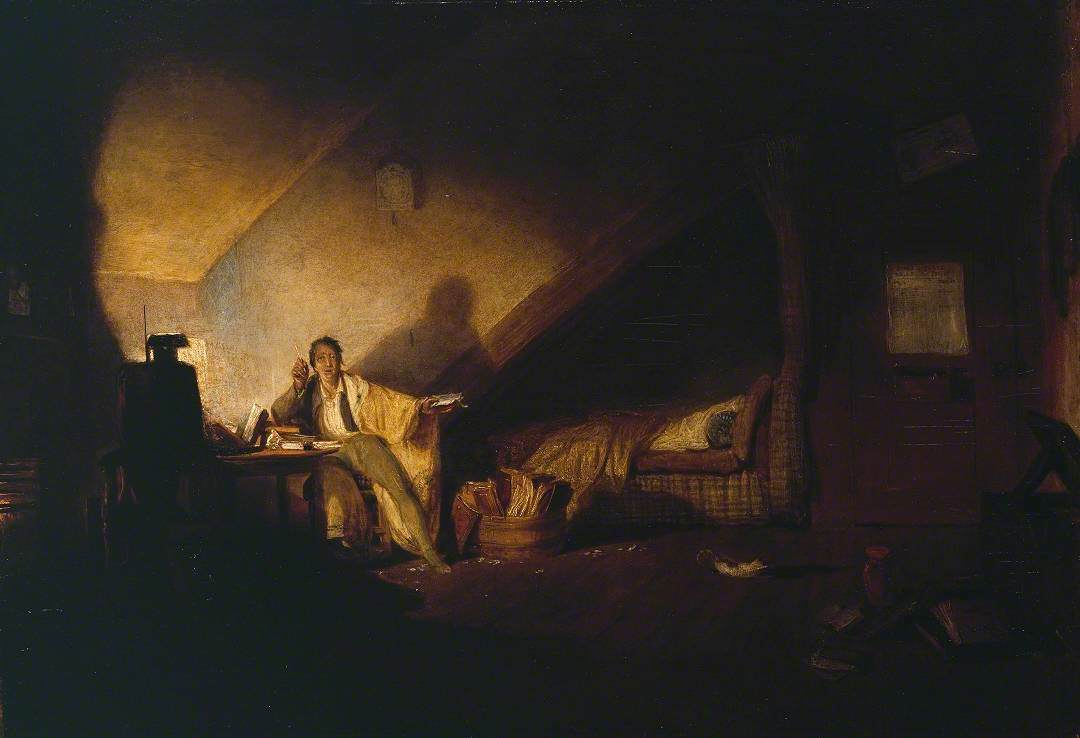
The Garreteer's Petition by Turner, 1809

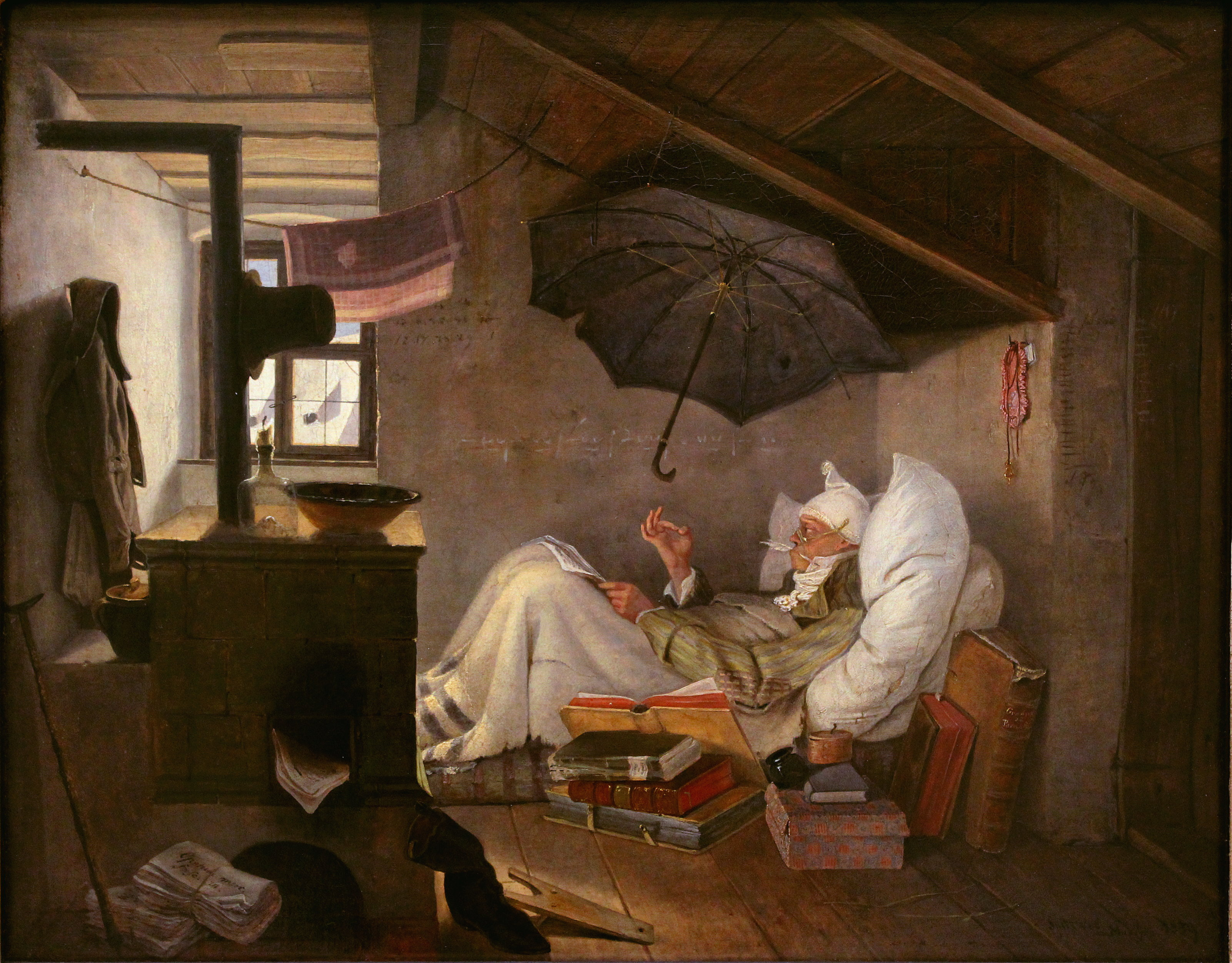
Carl Spitzweg, The Poor Poet (Der arme Poet), 1839, depicting a garret room

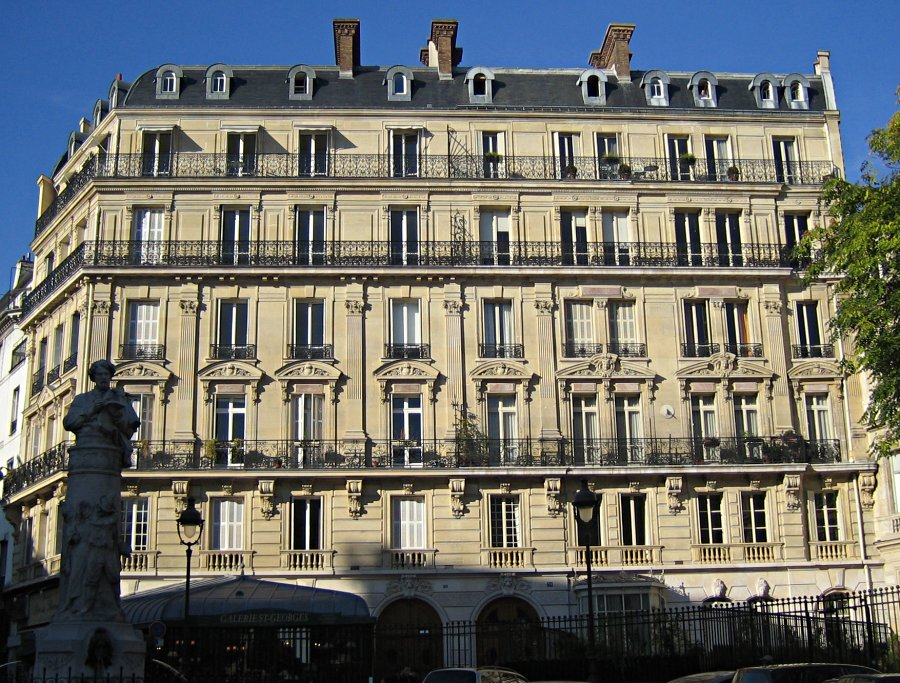
Place Saint-Georges in Paris, showing top-floor garret windows

A garret is a habitable attic, a living space at the top of a house or larger residential building, traditionally small with sloping ceilings. In the days before elevators this was the least prestigious position in a building, at the very top of the stairs.

== Etymology ==
The word entered Middle English through Old French with a military connotation of watchtower, garrison or billet – a place for guards or soldiers to be quartered in a house. Like garrison, it comes from an Old French word garir of ultimately Germanic origin meaning "to provide" or "defend".

== History ==
In the later 19th century, garrets became one of the defining features of Second Empire architecture in Paris, France, where large buildings were stratified socially between different floors. As the number of stairs to climb increased, the social status decreased. Garrets were often internal elements of the mansard roof, with skylights or dormer windows.

A "bow garret" is a two-story "outhouse" situated at the back of a typical terraced house often used in Lancashire for the hat industry in pre-mechanised days. "Bowing" was the name given to the technique of cleaning up animal (e.g. rabbit) fur in the early stages of preparation for turning it into hats. What is now believed to be the last bow garret in existence (in Denton, Greater Manchester) is now a listed building in order to preserve this historical relic.
