= Lands of Tour and Kirkland =

Estate in East Ayrshire, Scotland

Coordinates: 55.633651°N 4.516829°W

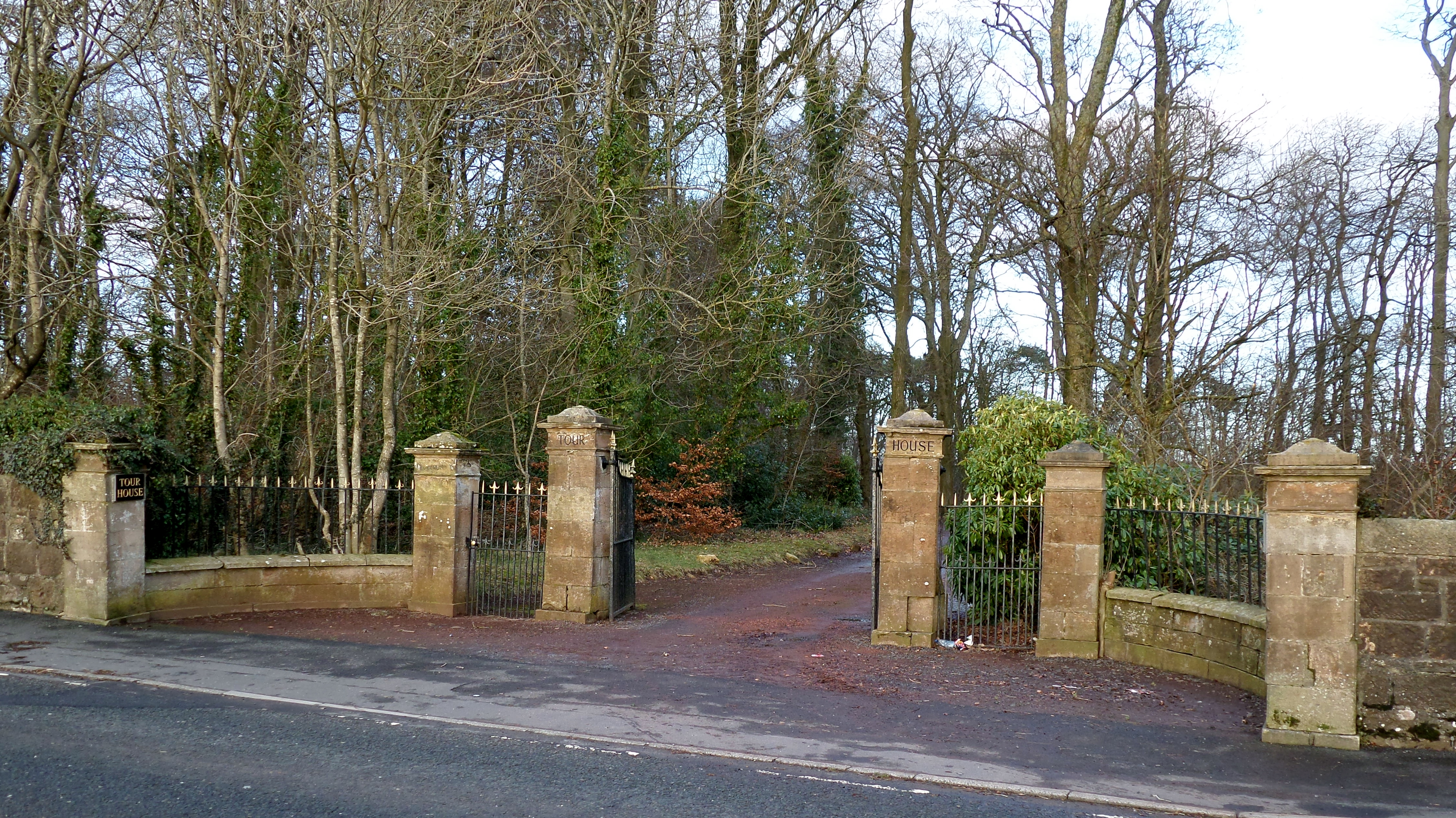
- The main entrance to Tour House in 2015

- Location within East Ayrshire
- OS grid reference: NS 41663 40662
- Council area: East Ayrshire
- Lieutenancy area: Ayrshire
- Country: Scotland
- Sovereign state: United Kingdom
- Post town: Kilmarnock
- Police: Scotland
- Fire: Scottish
- Ambulance: Scottish

The Lands of Tour and Kirkland (NS416406) formed a small estate close to the old Kirktoun and St Maurs-Glencairn collegiate church about 1 km south-east of Kilmaurs, East Ayrshire, Parish of Kilmaurs, Scotland. The word 'Tour' in Scots refers to a 'tower' and 'kirk' to a parish church.

== History ==
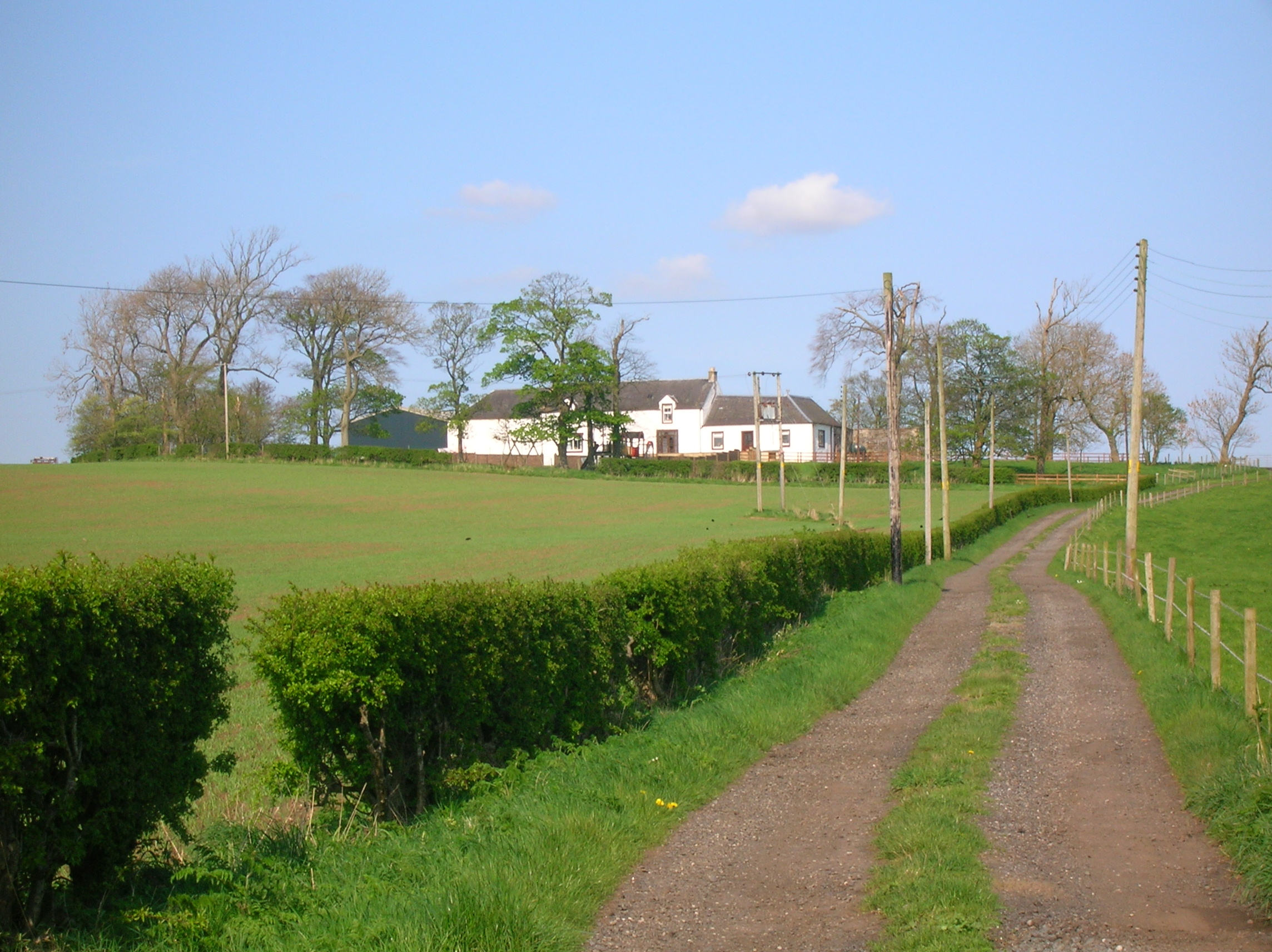
Jocksthorn Farm from the Kilmaurs Kirkton

The name 'Tower', changed to 'Tour' in the 1900s, as used nowadays for the nearby estate and the old monastic area below the glebe, derives from the old buildings of the collegiate church community dwellings that lay below this church, once described thus : "It is a high strong-built house, consisting of several apartments; ... most likely the clergy had this for their residence." It is recorded that the collegiate church had a provost, six to eight prebendaries and two choir boys and therefore a fair amount of accommodation was required.

The slightly rectangular shaped tower itself stood close to the surviving dovecot dated 1630 and still stood to a significant height as late as 1912, however it is now almost at foundations level as most of the old tower was removed to make it safe in the 1990s. Beattie records that the tower had a narrow entrance and a flagged floor with at ground level what appeared to be facilities for washing or bathing. The dovecot appears to be an adapted survival of an earlier monastic building as witnessed by the medieval carving of a face at the bottom of one of the crow-stepped gables.

The old dwelling is locally said to have been used by Huge de Morville lived here whilst Kilwinning Abbey was under construction and was last occupied in the 1660s. The Prebendary lands of the 'Tower' and the prebendary mill, once associated with the financing of the community, came to around 80 acres. Known as Kirk Fauld in 1967 it was previously known as Tour Gardens Farm.

The old collegiate church buildings would have been made use of in some way by the Cunninghames of Robertland from the time they acquired the lands in the 1530s as was usually the case following the Reformation in Scotland. The dovecot or doocot at the site has the date 1636 however the lower section has been tentatively dated to the 10th century as part of the collegiate church complex of buildings.

Kirk lands at the time of the Reformation in Scotland were often returned to the representatives of the founding families and this was the case at the collegiate church of Kilmaurs which returned to the Cunninghames of Robertland, granted by the Abbot and Convent of Kelso in 1532, in the person of David Cunninghame. The lands remained with that family until the 19th century. By the time of the Reformation the kirk lands of Kilmaurs had already been leased out to Cunninghame of Robertland, surprisingly for a smaller sum than the absentee minister could have expected to receive from the petty kirk dues.

Kirkland House is located off the Kilmarnock road on a lane that also runs up to the old manse that stands on the hill to the west overlooking the Tour policies.

=== Kilmaurs Castle ===
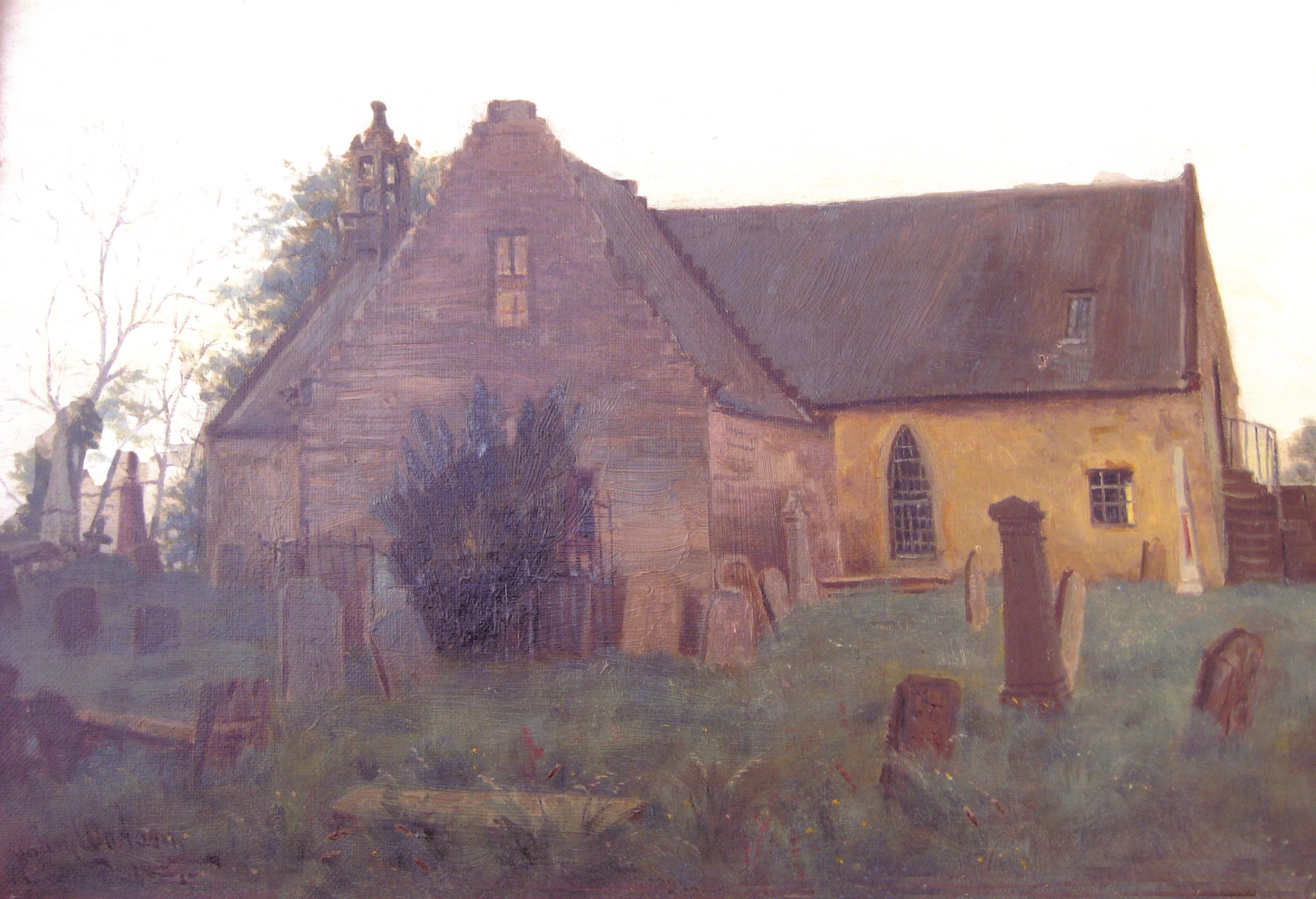
The old kirk of St Maurs with the Glencairn Aisle prior to alterations and the addition of the bell and clock tower.

Adamson relates in 1875 that the ancient castle of Kilmaurs was in the vicinity of Jock's or Jack's Thorn farm, now 'Jocksthorn' and several old people from Kilmaurs in 1875 remembered playing amongst the ruined remnants of masonry which occupied the site of this old castle of the Cunninghames. Adamson also talks of the typical woodland policies of such a dwelling still existing in the 1870s with venerable old trees, what sounds like roundels of trees, avenues that may have defined lanes or rides, etc. All of these are not normally associated with farms and he appears to clinch the argument of the castles site by describing the "..sward covered circular mound" or motte at the 'traditional' site. Roys military map of the area dating from the 1750s indicate a large area of probable woodland/land that is not being cultivated where Kilmaurs Castle is said to have once stood. Armstrong's map of 1775 indicates a castle-like building at the supposed site although the name 'Jock's Thorn' appears to be linked with it.

Metal detectorists have found a number of medieval coins in this area amongst what may be old building and foundation stones. The 19th-century 6 inch OS Map of Kilmaurs marks the supposed site of Kilmaurs Castle as lying off the side of the farm road leading to Jocksthorn Farm from the old Stewarton Road.

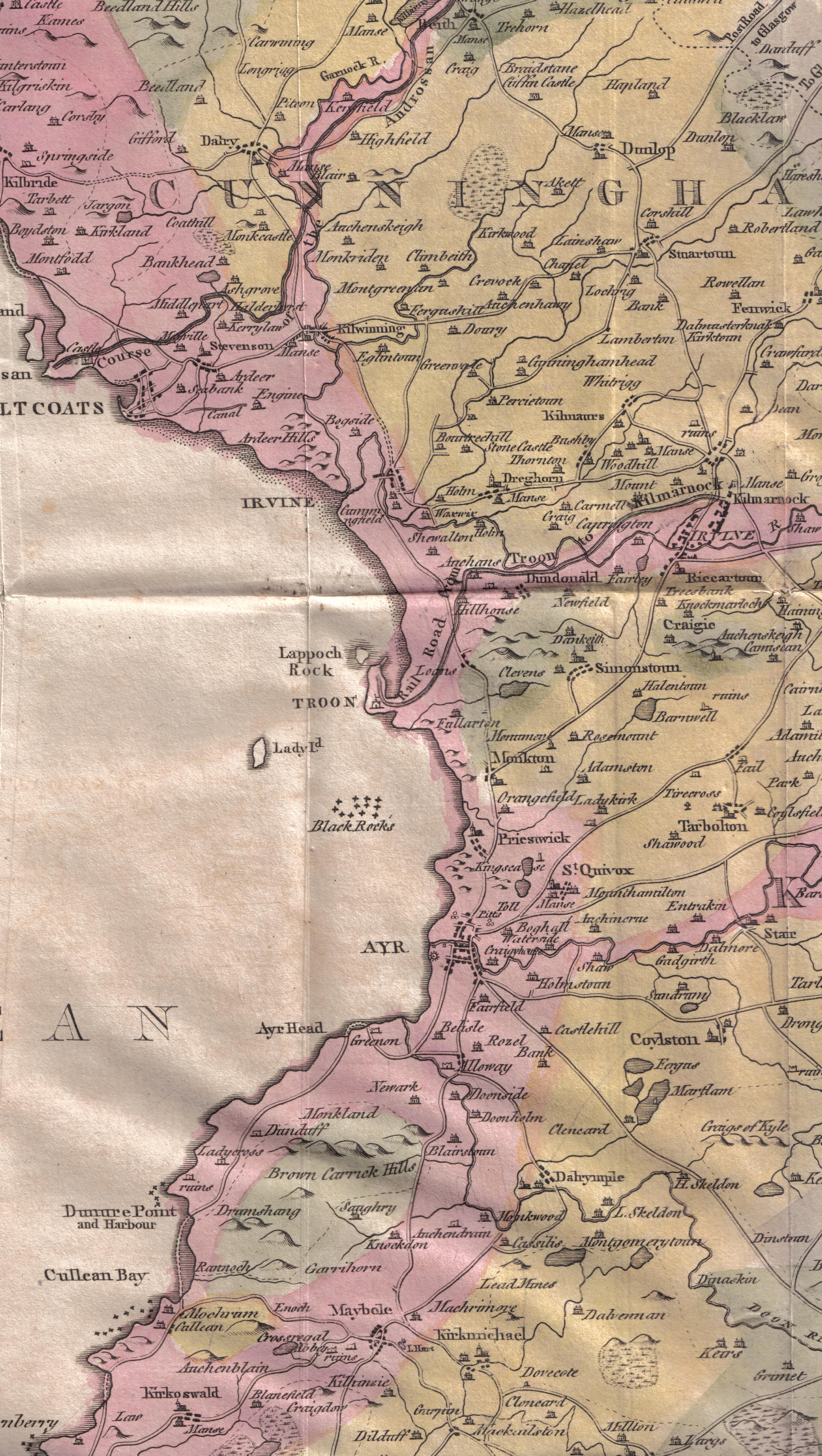
William Aiton's map of 1811 showing the ruins of Kilmaurs Castle near Jocksthorn.

Dobie in 1874 that the old baronial residence was about a mile South-East of Kilmaurs and ruins could still be pointed out on the farmlands of Jocksthorn. He goes on to say that this could have been the 'Villam de Cunninghame', the original residence and first possession of this ancient family.

The traditional site therefore of another 'tower', Kilmaurs Castle, as opposed to Kilmaurs Place, is located to the north-east of Tour, just off the entrance to Jocksthorn Farm that connects with the Stewarton road via Grassmillside Farm and Shaw Bridge.

The map by Timothy Pont from circa 1600 marks Kirkland with no reference to Tour.

Tours House first appears as 'Towers' on Robert Aitkens map of 1829 and on also John Thomson's 1832 map in a small woodland bounded enclosure.

=== Tour House and estate ===
In the Statistical Account of 1791-99 James Watson was the owner of the tower and its old monastic Cistercian buildings, separated from the church by a garden, "laid out with excellent tafte, efpecially of the kind that is favourable to retirement and meditation." This suggests that the dwelling was at this site at this time.

The mansion house and grounds

The RCAHMS records that Tour is a castle-style, two-storey mansion, rebuilt about 1841. The office wall is terminated by a crow-stepped garden house which was a dovecot at one time.

McNaught's Map of Kilmaurs Parish.

Close states that a rubble built barn dated 1636 has a dovecot built into one end in the 19th century. Love records that James Ingram was the architect for the alterations to the mansion house.

The B-Listed 1841 mansion house was rebuilt by Robert Parker Adam of Brazil, a Glasgow merchant. It is a two-storey building, ashlar, constructed with a castle-like appearance. The central two-storey porch projects with a Gothic doorway. To the rear are sited octagonal corner turrets. A crow stepped garden house is a modified dovecote or doocot. A number of outbuildings are increasingly shown on OS maps.

Close and Riches regard Tour as having been enlarged for Robert Adams rather than rebuilt, the existing building having been added to already in 1823 by the Cathcarts.

Internally the mansion house, recast in the 1840s "has a plaster-vaulted porch with stiff-leaf bosses, an interior hall, its cornice and ceiling panel with fleuron detail, opening through a Tudor-arched screen to the staircase which is also set behind a screen. The well stair has a flat candelabra-like cast-iron balusters and a plaster-panelled, coved ceiling with a central octagonal roof-light."

An escutcheon carved on the building at Tour is thought to be the coat of arms of the Cathcart family.

The remains of an ice house are located near the house, close to the Tour Burn that runs down to the Carmel Water via the Lady's Well. The burn is shown with a dam upstream of the ice house, creating a pond and a source of ice in the winter.

The one surviving traditional Gate Lodge is located at the main entrance to Tour House. A second gate lodge was once located at the second entrance to the estate on the Kilmarnock side of the estate.

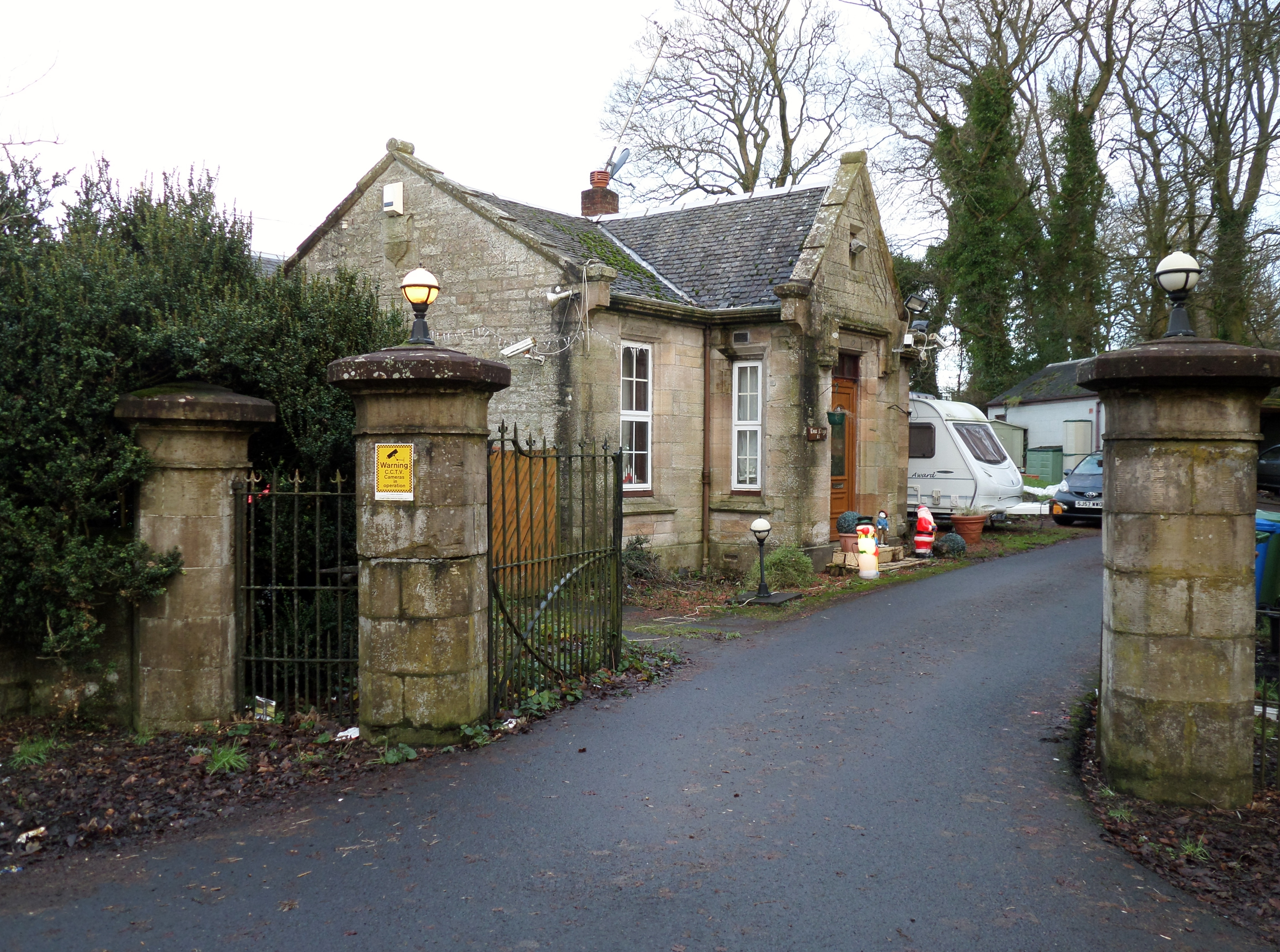
The surviving Tour lodge house.

A private gas works and gasometer were located at Tour in 1856 as indicated by the OS maps.

Mr Cathcart is recorded to have greatly improved the property with plantations in the early 19th century.

A walled garden with several associated greenhouses dating from at least the 1850s is located to the east of the mansion house and has a late 18th-century over its entrance. The 1856 OS map indicates a Summer House and bowling green located on the east side of the walled garden.

An isolated building in a patch of woodland near the mansion house in 1895 has the appearance of a summer house.

The 1937 OS map still shows a feature in front of the house that may have been a bowling green or a tennis court.

Curling pond

Within the screen of the woodland policies near the south gate lodge was a large rectangular curling pond in an area known as 'Fauldfield' with no obvious source of water other than the small Woodhill Burn near the old Sandyford Cottage. All that remains is the depression in the ground. The OS maps show it to be present in 1897 and 1911, however by 1938 it is no longer annotated as a curling pond. In the Kilmarnock Standard 19 April 1913 its construction is described and it is referred to as the 'Kilmaurs artificial' curling pond.

The estate

First shown in the 1750s as 'Sandy Ford' in 1856 a dwelling known as Sandyford, located near the Kilmaurs to Kilmarnock road is shown for the last time, located in a patch of ground just on the Kilmarnock side of the Woodhill Burn at the southern extremity of the Tour woodlands. A significant ford could have been present before field drainage work over the years altered the drainage pattern; this burn has a confluence with the Carmel Water.

In 1889 the estate was sold by the Adams family in two portions, with David Dunlop of Fenwick purchasing Bellsland and Jocksthorn whilst Kirkland, the mansion-house and policies were sold to a Mrs Pollock of Barrhead. In 1904 a former Rangoon merchant, J. G. Findlay, became the proprietor at Tour.

=== Lady's Well ===
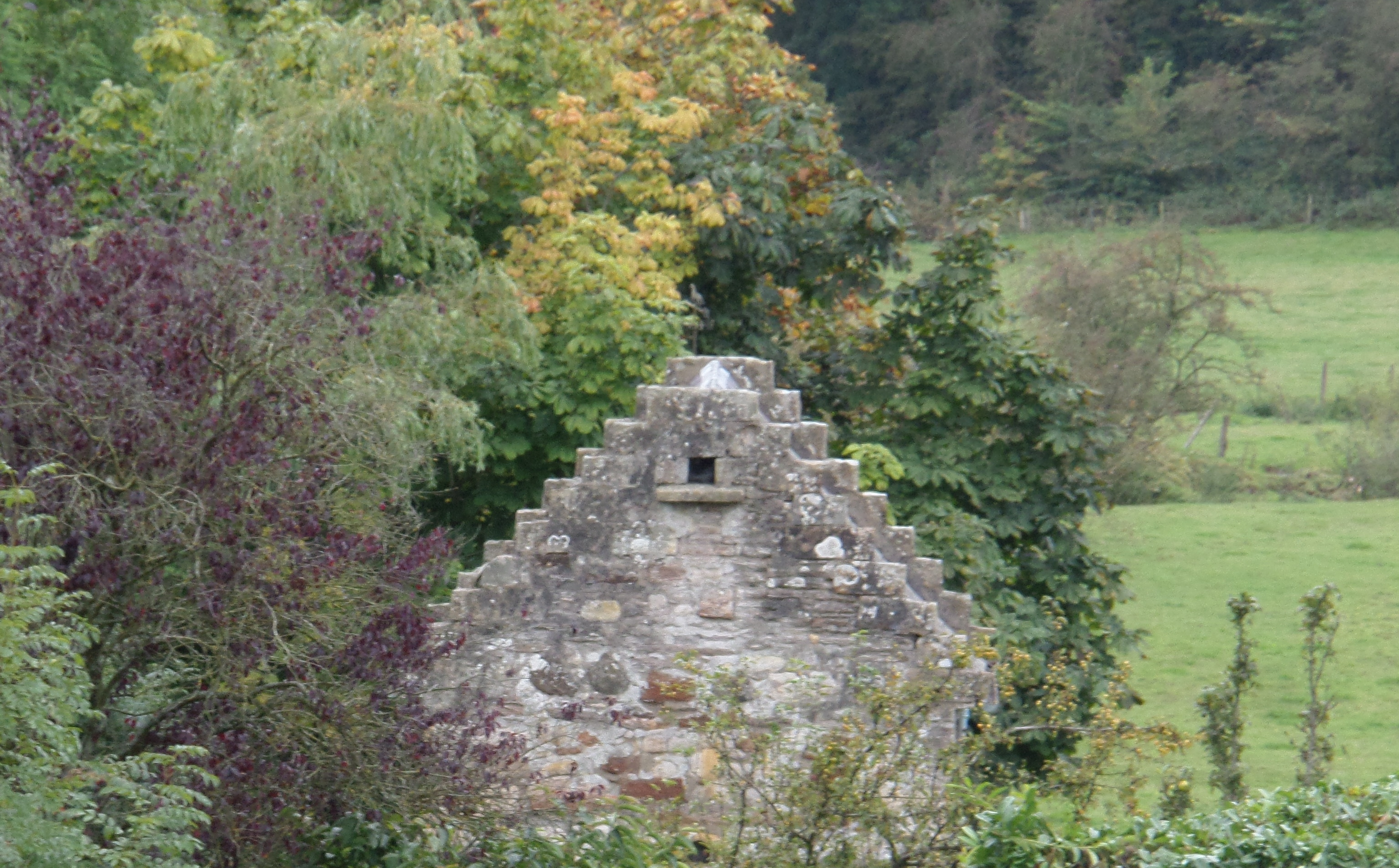
The Tour dovecot.

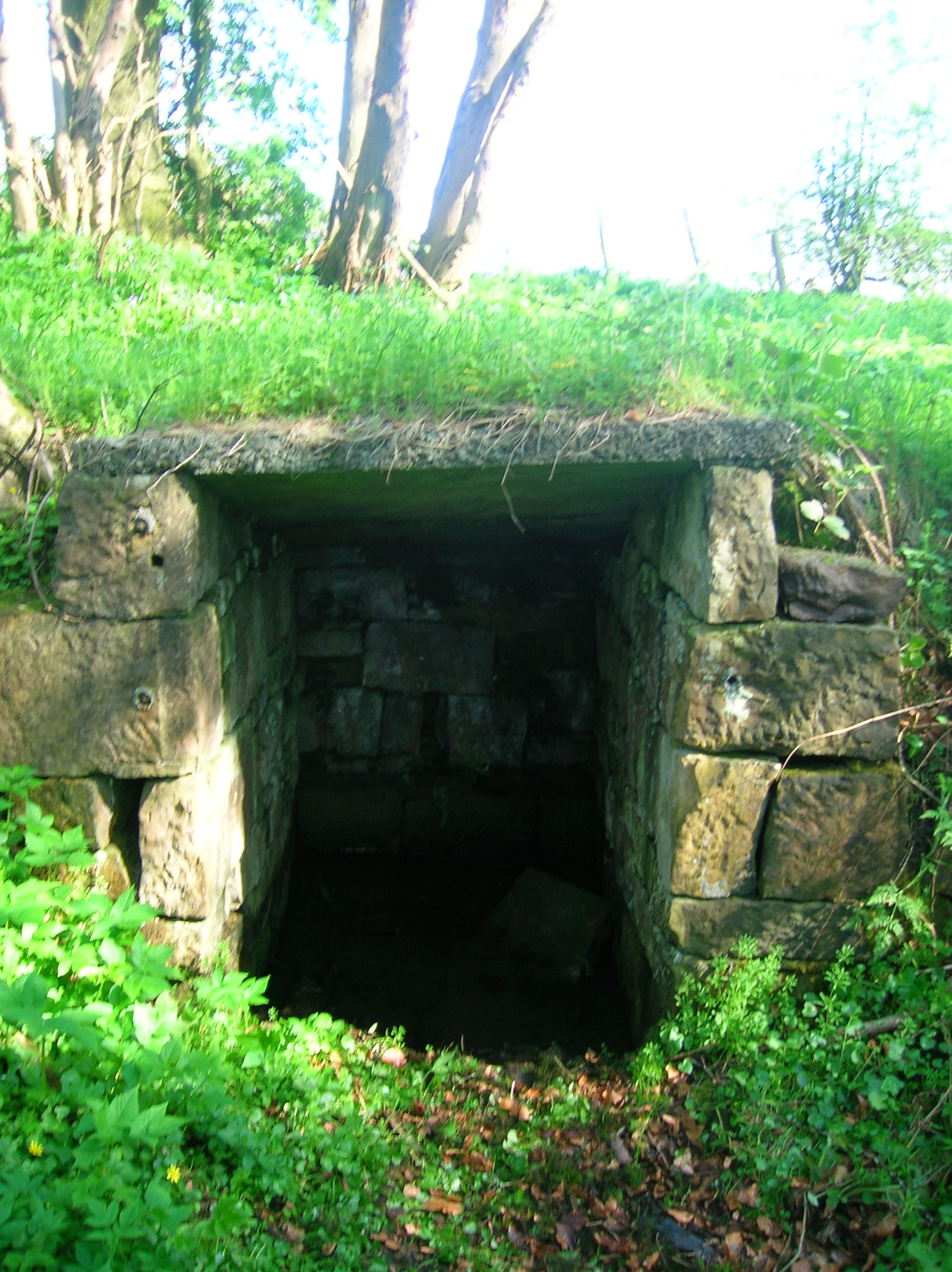
The Lady's Well

The Kilmaurs Glencairn church Minister (2007), the Rev. John Urquhart, has been informed by the locals that the well is named after the wife of an owner of Tour House who daily came to collect the cool water. Mr. Findlay of Tour is recorded by McNaught as having enjoy the never failing water, of excellent quality, and refreshingly cool on the hottest day of summer as late as 1912. An opening in the ashlar estate wall opposite the entrance to Tour House near the Gate Lodge allows direct access to the woods in which the well is situated near the now demolished hamlet of Pathfoot, marked on the 1750s Roy's map as 'Old Yard'.

The repairs on the well using a concrete slab as part of the roof and the ashlar walling appear to have been carried out within the last century. The original path down to the old hamlet of Pathfoot or 'Old Yard' was located slightly to the east before the short section of typical ashlar 'estate' boundary wall was built.

=== Lairds of Tour and Kirkland ===
The ownership and history of the lands of Tour and Kirkland were at many points in time intertwined.

Hugh de Morville of Burgh by Sands in Cumberland held the whole of the lands of Cunninghame from King David I, a 12th-century ruler. Warnebald, also from near Burgh by Sands, held the Manor of Kilmaurs and took the name 'Cunninghame'. Warnebald's son Robert inherited and he gave the patronage of Kilmaurs church and half a carucate of land to the monks of Kelso. In 1403 Sir William Cunninghame founded and endowed the collegiate church of Kilmaurs.

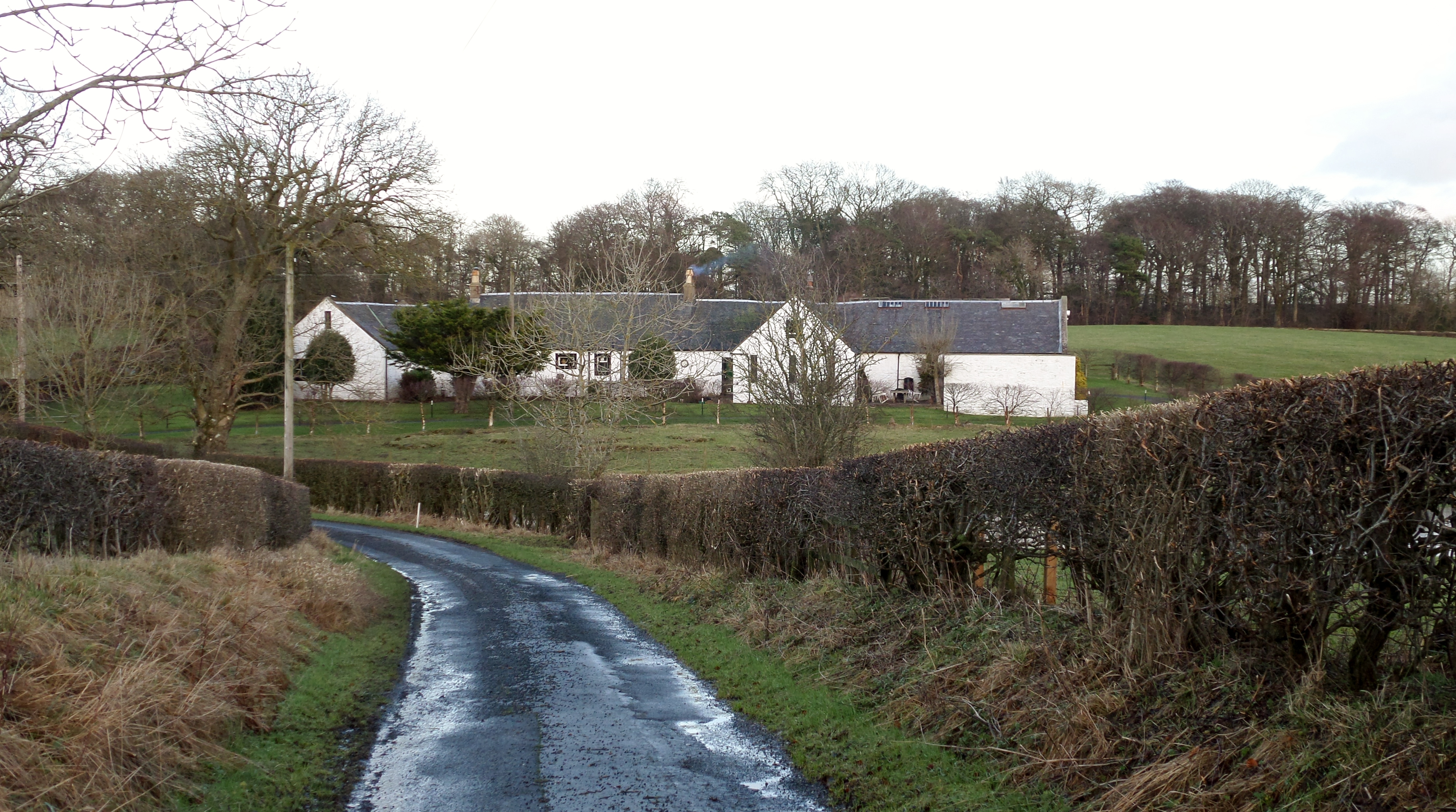
Kirklands Farm from the old St Maurs Manse.

David Cunninghame was granted the church lands of 'Kirkland-Kilmares' by the Abbot and Convent of Kelso in 1532, including the portion of land called 'Garnell Croft' and in circa 1604 it had passed to William Cunninghame, designated of "Touer-lands". In 1572 a James Cunninghame of 'Tourlandis' is recorded. In 1698, William Watson, Senior baillie lived at Tour House and the Findlays lived at the estate in the early 1900s. In 1976 Dr and Mrs McAllister dwelt lived here.

It has been suggested that the 'Tourlands' in the 1640s were held by James Hay, son of James Hay, however Towerlands near Bourtreehill may be the property concerned. In 1676 a James Cunninghame of Tour is recorded.

In 1572 David Barclay of Kirkland is recorded, the son of William Barclay of Perceton. in 1586 John Cunninghame, son of Patrick Cunninghame of Kirkland was a party to the murder of Hugh Montgomerie, 4th Earl of Eglinton at Stewarton. Archibald, designated of "Kirklands" died in 1614 and left six children, Patrick, David, Archibald, Adam, Bessie and Margaret. David is referred to in 1630 and Patrick in 1633 as a feuar of Kirkland, suggesting that the brothers jointly held the property. In 1634 Archibald of Kirkland was succeeded by his eldest son. In 1645 a Patrick Cunninghame, married to Elizabeth Henderson died.

William Watson in 1694 is recorded as the proprietor, possibly through marriage and the lands stayed with the family until 1814 when the line ended with an heiress who married William Cathcart of Carlton, formerly of Jamaica. James Watson, Esq. was a Greenock based merchant who was the proprietor of 'The Tower' circa 1791 - 1799.

Sir John Cathcart, Bart of Tours is recorded in the heritor's minutes of 1836. George James Cathcart, cousin to William, inherited in 1841 and a Glasgow based merchant, Robert Parker Adam, purchased the property. Margaret Haldane of Auchans was his spouse and his eldest son William Parker Adam inherited.

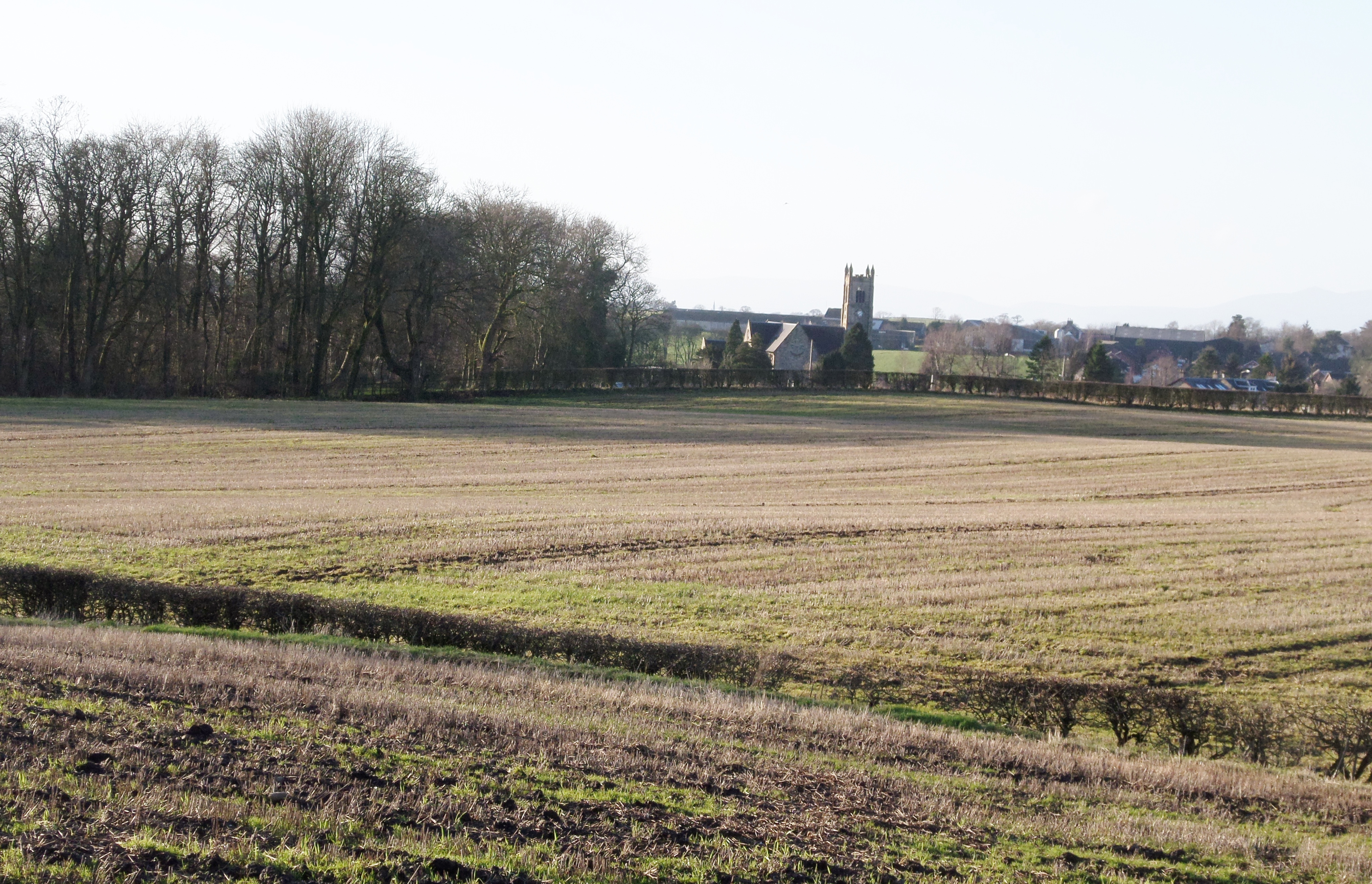
Tour woods and St Maurs-Glencairn church from the site of Kilmaurs Castle.

In 1889 the estate was sold by the Adams family with Kirkland going to David Dunlop of Fenwick and the mansion-house and policies being sold to a Mrs Pollock of Barrhead. In 1904 a former Rangoon merchant, J. G. Findlay, became the proprietor of Tour.

== Prehistory ==
A copper alloy flanged axehead was found in a ploughed field (NS419404) and was deposited in Glasgow Art Gallery and Museum.

A carved stone ball of fine-grained sandstone, 2.5 inches (64 mm) in diameter, with the surface ornamented by six equal, circular and slightly projecting discs was found at Jock's Thorn Farm (NS 417 410).

== History ==
David Cunninghame, son of Patrick Cunninghame of Kirkland, was created a baronet in 1633 as Sir David Cunninghame of Auchenharvie. The house was advertised for lease for the 1839 Eglinton Tournament and at that time was stated to have three public rooms and six bedrooms. St Maurs-Glencairn Church contains a marble memorial plaque to James George Findlay of Tour and his eldest son who was killed at the Gallipoli Campaign.

== See also ==
- Towerlands, North Ayrshire
- Kilmaurs Castle
- Kilmaurs Place
- Kilmaurs
- Lady Well
