= Kilmaurs =

Coordinates: 55.639444°N 4.530278°W

Kilmaurs: Scottish Gaelic: Cill Mhàrais
- Village
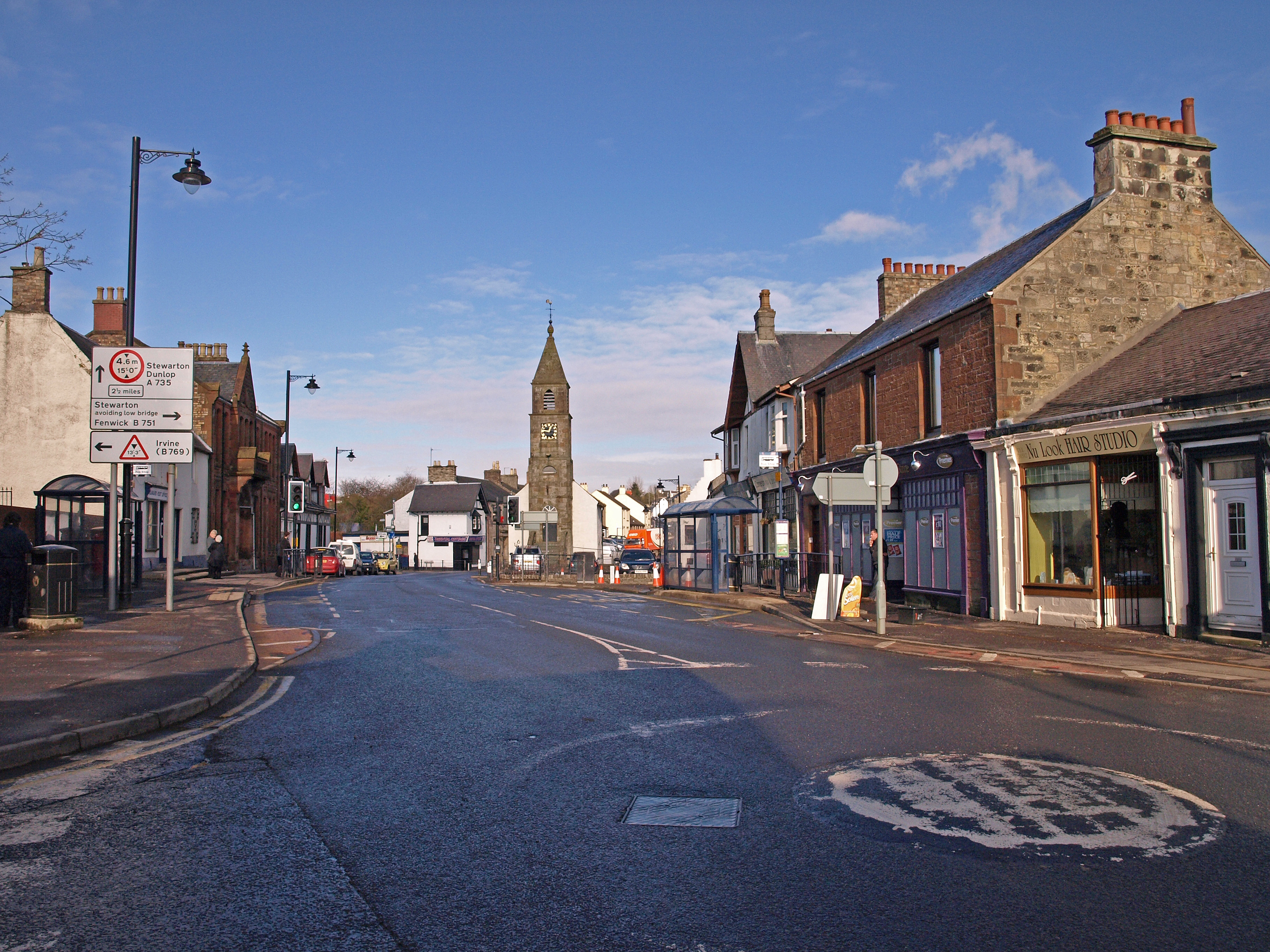
- Kilmaurs Cross, showing the old Kilmaurs Tolbooth in the centre

- Location within East Ayrshire
- Population: 2,790 (2020)
- OS grid reference: NS407413
  - Edinburgh: 56 mi (90 km)
  - London: 432 mi (695 km)
- Council area: East Ayrshire
- Lieutenancy area: Ayrshire and Arran
- Country: Scotland
- Sovereign state: United Kingdom
- Post town: Kilmarnock
- Postcode district: KA3
- Police: Scotland
- Fire: Scottish
- Ambulance: Scottish
- UK Parliament: Kilmarnock and Loudoun
- Scottish Parliament: Kilmarnock and Irvine Valley

Kilmaurs (from Scottish Gaelic Cill Mhàrais) is a village in East Ayrshire, Scotland which lies just outside of the largest settlement in East Ayrshire, Kilmarnock. It lies on the Carmel Water, 21 miles (34 kilometres) southwest of Glasgow. Population recorded for the village in the 2001 Census recorded 2,601 people resided in the village It was in the Civil Parish of Kilmaurs.

== Prehistory ==
The fossilised remains of eight mammoths were found in Woodhill quarry, Kilmaurs.

== History ==
=== Early history ===
Kilmaurs was known as the hamlet of Cunninghame until the 13th century. The population in 1874 was 1,145. Alex Young suggested that the name Kilmaurs comes from the Gaelic meaning Hill of the Great Cairn. Young’s suggestion for the Gaelic origins of the placename Kilmaurs is extremely unlikely. Earliest medieval records refer to an early medieval church dedicated to a saint (probably a Saint Maura) closely associated with the origins of the ancient settlement. The authoritative Ainmean-Àite na h-Alba website endorses the ecclesiastical origins of the name though exact identity of the saint remains unclear.

=== Economic and religious ===
It was once noted for its cutlery, shoe and bonnet workshops, and there were iron and coal mines in the neighbourhood. A hanger is a type of hunting sword, the only remaining Scottish example of which was made in Kilmaurs; it is in the keeping of the Kelvingrove Museum in Glasgow. The hanger sword is marked 'Kilmares' and is marked 'DB' for the maker or cutler, David Biggart, who also made knives and forks. This sword is highly ornate with the grip made of tortoiseshell with floral patterns in extremely fine twisted silver wire. Fork over fork, is part of the kilmaurs coat of arms, relating to the history of the village cutlery heritage and for forking out prisoners and those hiding in hay to avoid capture. Kilmaurs was famous for its kale which was an important foodstuff. A story is told of how a neighbouring village offered to pay a generous price for some kale seeds, an offer too good to turn down. The cunning locals agreed, however a gentle roasting on a shovel over a coal fire ensured that they never germinated.

The Parish church, Saint Maurs, now St Maurs-Glencairn, dates from 1170, and was dedicated either to the Virgin or to a Scottish saint of the 9th century called Maura. Maura was a Scottish saint who is said to have died in 899. She lived and worked on the isle of Little Cumbrae, and was thought to be the daughter of a Scottish Chieftain. It was enlarged in 1403 and in great part rebuilt in 1888.

The reputed warlock, John Stewart, is said to have regularly met with the fairies on Kilmaurs Hill.

=== Cunninghams and the Glencairn Aisle ===
Etymology
Carmel, the oldest form of which is Caremuall, is thought to be derived, according to McNaught and also Smith, from the Gaelic 'Car' meaning a 'fort', and 'Meall'. meaning a hill. Therefore, 'The Hill fort'. Bowie's Munt at Knocklandside is one strong candidate for the site of the 'Hill Fort'.

James Cunningham, 14th Earl of Glencairn.

Adjoining it is the Glencairn Aisle, burial-place of the Earls of Glencairn, the leading personages in the district during several centuries, some of whom bore the style of Lord Kilmaurs. The aisle, designed and erected in 1600 by David Scwgal, Mason burgess from Carel, (he was also responsible for designing the tomb dedicated to William Schaw, James VI's Master of Works in Dunfermline Abbey), contains the restored tomb of the 7th. Earl with his wife and eight children. Their family name was Cunningham, adopted from the baillie which they acquired in the 12th century, or more probably from the old district of Cunninghame (Ayrshire) where the town is situated.

The De Morville family lived at Tour house nearby. The family built Kilwinning Abbey, a daughter was the mother of John Baliol and another member was one of the murderers of Thomas a Becket. The town was made a burgh of barony in 1527 by the earl of that date. Robert Burns's patron, James Cunningham the fourteenth earl of Glencairn, upon whose death the poet wrote his touching "Lament", sold the Kilmaurs estate in 1786 to the Marchioness of Titchfield. Later the family held the title of Duke of Portland.

Kilmaurs has strong links with the Cunningham family who are associated with the toun of Lambroughton for a significant period during their rise to power. The Cunningham chiefs had a weaker connection with the barony of Kilmaurs after 1484 when Finlaystone became the family seat; Sir William Cunningham of Kilmaurs had married Margaret Denniston, sole heir to Sir Robert Denniston in 1405, and the dowry included the baronies of Denniston and Finlaystone in Renfrewshire, the lands of Kilmaronock in Dunbartonshire, and the barony of Glencairn in Dumfriesshire. James, the fourteenth Earl of Glencairn broke the centuries-old connection of the Cunningham family with the area by selling the Barony and estate of Kilmaurs, including Kilmaurs place, in 1786 to the Marchioness of Titchfield.

=== Laigh Milton viaduct ===
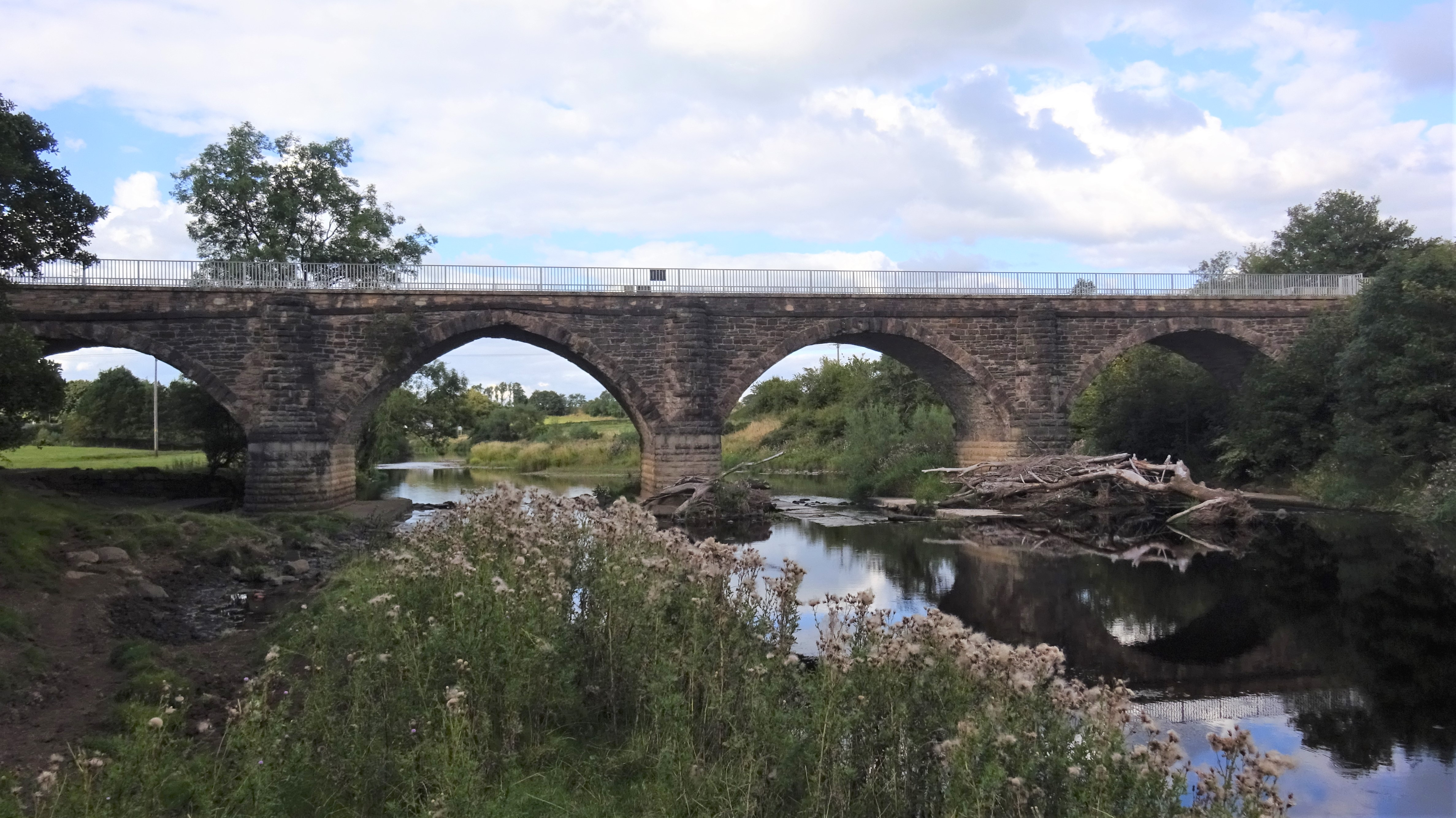
Laigh Milton Viaduct is the oldest surviving railway bridge in Scotland

One sad story redolent of its era is that of a 'professional class' couple from England, Mr. & Mrs. Barker, who committed suicide in Victorian times (1844) by tying themselves together and jumping from Laigh Milton Viaduct into the Irvine, which has a depth of only around three feet (90 centimetres) at this point. They were buried in the Kilmaurs churchyard in an unmarked grave. They are known to have spent a few weeks in lodgings and apparently enjoyed the 'sights and sounds' of Ayrshire. It transpired that they had recently become bankrupt and were fearful of the shame and disgrace that poverty would inevitably bring.

=== The Tolbooth (also known as the Jougs) ===
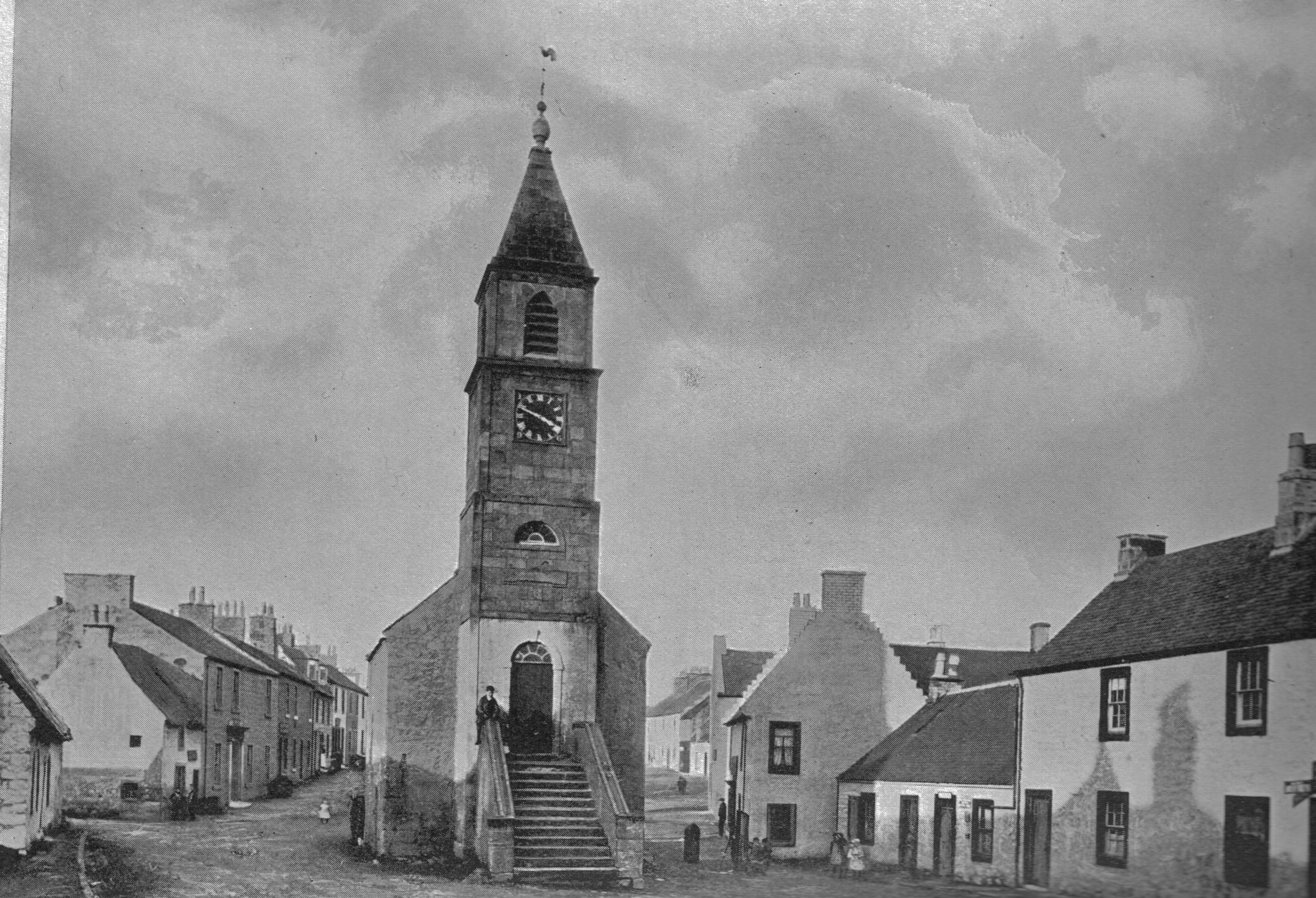
The Jougs in 1900

Kilmaurs Tolbooth accommodated the council chambers and jail of the former Burgh of Barony and latterly of the Parish Council. It is known locally as the 'jougs', 'Jugs' or 'Juggs' after the metal collar and chain that still hangs from the wall. The village also once had stocks for holding and humiliating miscreants.

A tower of some description existed before the present steeple was built in 1800. The present Town house with its council chamber and originally two vaulted cells below may date from at least 1709 with repairs recorded in 1743. One was entered by a small door facing west. Close refers to the building as being a tower house in miniature. The Burgh of Barony with its forty "tenementers" was established in 1527 so an earlier Council House is likely to have existed.

Internally the council chamber had a bench, a dock and a space between for the clerks and councillors and a fireplace was once present. The 'Jougs' was also used as the Kilmaurs fire station in the 19th century; the fire engine being housed in one of the two prison cells of the old jail. The Dick Institute in Kilmarnock now houses the preserved wooden 1830s fire engine. It was in good condition and still at Kilmaurs in the 1940s, painted pillar-box red and carrying the Glencairn coat of arms. The stout wood tank held around fifty gallons and the hose is only two yards long; the engine was hauled by a pair of horses. Cuthbertson records that the village's hand bell reposed on the engine. The Kilmaurs jougs themselves were used in last used in 1820 when a housebreaker was held in them. He was so small that he had to be stood on a stone block.

William Aiton in 1808 commented on the Kilmaurs town-hall and jail, saying they "are contemptible, of little use, and ought to be pulled down." In 1874 the steeple was hit by lightning and 12 feet (3.7 metres) of masonry were destroyed. Rebuilding severely stretched the burgh's finances.

The original tolbooth stood nearby at the crossroads and may have been used to hold prisoners when the Council House was just a single storey.

=== The Mercat Cross and Butter Market ===
Kilmaurs has a fine example of a stepped Mercat Cross in an enclosure behind it; this cross is surmounted by a large sandstone ball and dated 1830, once enclosed by railings. On market days a holed board was placed on top and used as basic scales for weighing goods for sale. A record of a cross being repaired survives from 1743 indicating that an older cross once stood here. The back of the building had a lean to building with a window and a chimney in 1895. Latterly the butter market was held here.

=== Public Hall ===
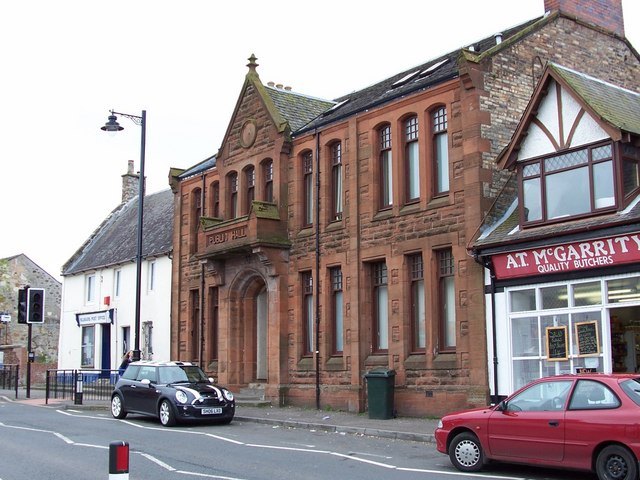
Kilmaurs Public Hall located on the main street

This fine building was designed by Robert McHoull, constructed at a cost of £1,400 and completed in 1893. This town hall building had a stage, changing rooms, and a kitchen on the ground floor, a reading room, a recreation room and a viewing gallery on the upper floor. Unfortunately the architect did not have a stairway on the drawings, and had to construct a very narrow and winding staircase to reach the upper floor, as a last resort, before the official opening. It is now used by the District Council as a home for the homeless, or as a shelter for single parent families, while waiting for a permanent residence.

=== Modern history ===
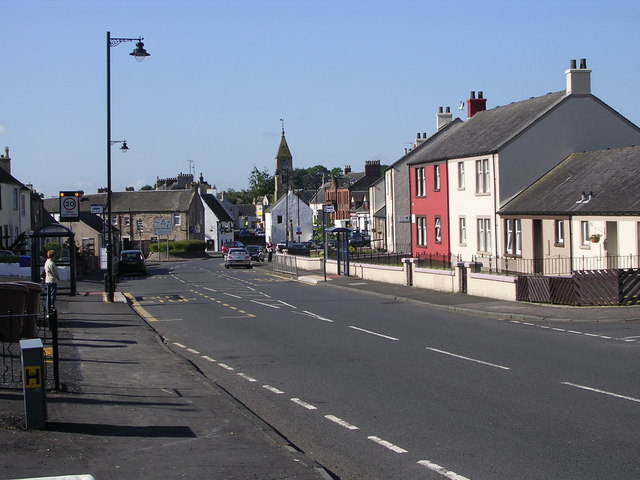
Approaching Kilmaurs from Stewarton

Kilmaurs has a particularly fine war memorial situated in the Morton Park (gifted to the village by George Morton of Lochgreen, Troon in 1921.) The memorial itself, which was designed by William Kellock Brown, was erected at a cost of £900 raised by public subscription and unveiled on 3 April 1921. 45 men gave their lives in the Great War and 10 men and 1 woman in the Second World War.

To prevent the Covenanters holding 'Conventicles', King Charles II moved highland troops, the 'Highland Host' into the westland of Ayrshire. "They took free quarters; they robbed people on the high road; they knocked down and wounded those who complained; they stole, and wantonly destroyed, cattle; they subjected people to the torture of fire to discover to them where their money was hidden; they threatened to burn down houses if their demands were not at once complied with; besides free quarters they demanded money every day; they compelled even poor families to buy brandy and tobacco for them; they cut and wounded people from sheer devilment." The cost of all this amounted to £3,250 15s 0d Scots in Kilmaurs parish alone.

Paterson records that in the 1790s inoculation for smallpox had not become general, owing, according to the minister, "to the prevalence of a religious persuasion that the Divine Government, without any care on the part of man, will accomplish whatever is best for him. So deeply are the tenets of this kind impressed, that all attempts to show the necessity of using those means by which the Providence of God operates, both in temporal and spiritual concerns, are 'houted' and despised. Much," he adds, "have the teachers of religion to answer for, who establish faith upon the ruins of practice."

It is likely that the Cunningham Fair mentioned in the Jolly Beggars was held in Kilmaurs and it is known from his letters to Frances Dunlop that as a farmer Robert Burns attended the fair.

== Landmarks ==
=== Murdock's or the Penny Bridge ===
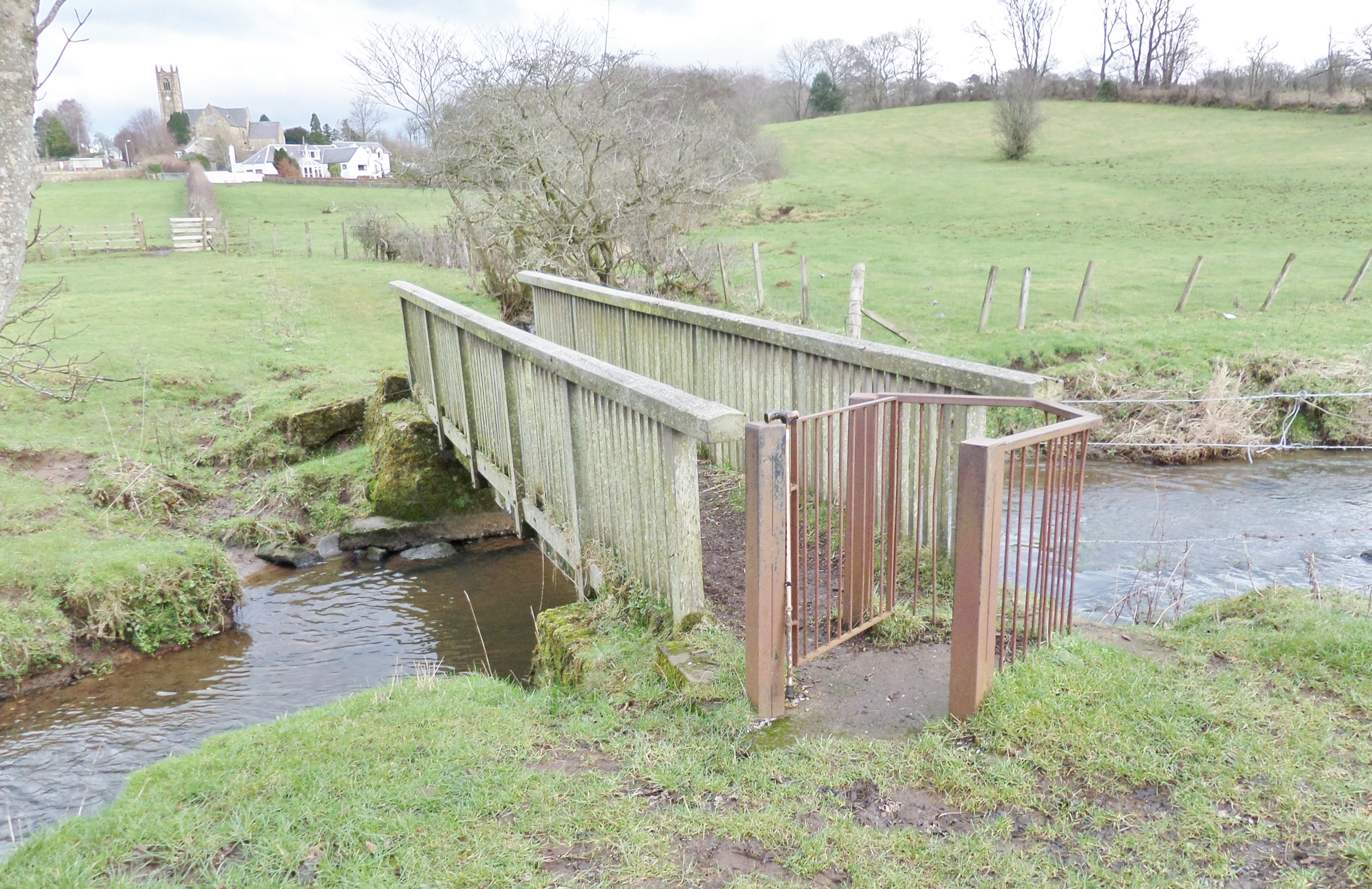
The replacement bridge for Murdock's Bridge.

This was the first iron bridge in Ayrshire and was built across the Carmel Water near St Maurs-Glencairn church to provide a shortcut for pedestrians travelling to Knockentiber and Crosshouse as well as a route to the old Woodhill limestone quarries for local workmen and to the old archery club's ground on the Carmel Holm next to the Woodhill railway viaduct. It was a wrought iron construction of "fine workmaship" and was paid for by public subscription with every person in the "west" paying a penny towards it. A gala day was held at its official opening. It was still in a good state of preservation in 1895 and was serviceable as late as the 1980s however its significance was overlooked and it was replaced with a wooden bridge at a time when it was around two hundred years old. The Murdoch or Murdock (anglicised version) concerned was William Murdoch (21 August 1754 – 15 November 1839) from Lugar, East Ayrshire, the inventor of gas lighting and an engineer who worked for Boulton and Watt.

=== Knockland Hill or Bowie's Munt ===
Bowie's munt or mount is close to the old Knocklandside and Knocklandhill farms. The name 'Knock' means a small hill, often fortified. This wooded mound is surrounded by a circular ditch and bank. It is unlikely to have been a belvedere or roundel and an origin as a hill fort is most likely; only an archaeological investigation will settle the matter. No internal features are clearly visible, other than the outlines of a lane or track on the Kilmaurs village side. In 1636 it was known as Knockallan; Knockland may be a corruption of this name.

=== Bailliehill Mount Iron Age Hill Fort ===
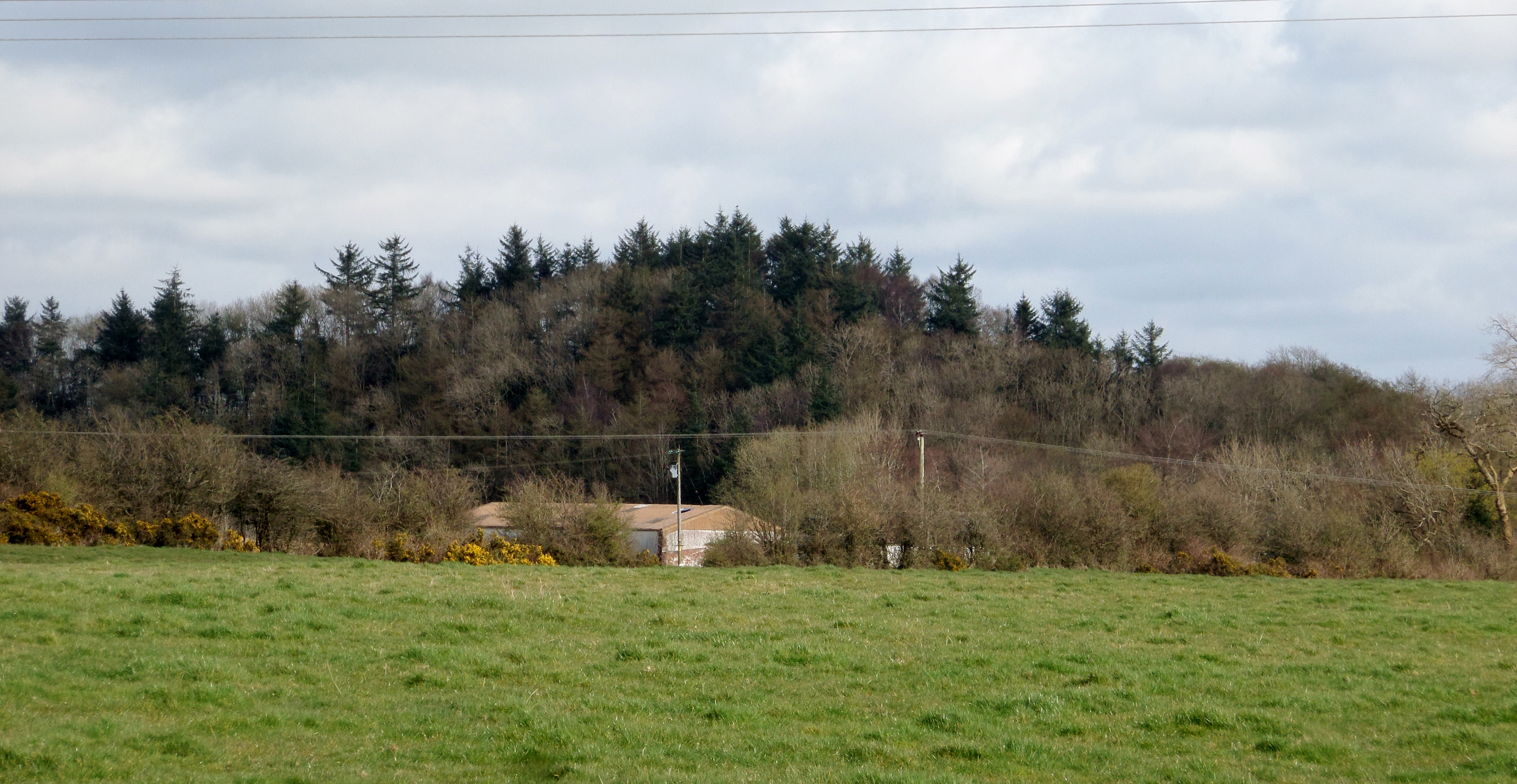
Bailliehill Mount Iron Age hill fort

An Iron Age hill fort is located on the summit of Bailliehill or Bullyhill Mount that overlooks the Carmel Water and Carmyle or Waterpark Farm near Knockentiber. The remains consist of a circular bank and ditch with a possible second bank on the north-east side. What may be rig and furrow inside complicate the interpretation of the site. It has been suggested that the hill also acted as the moot hill for the barony of Kilmaurs.

=== Loupin'-on-stane ===
Outside the Old Person's Cabin in the main street is a large sandstone block which is thought to be a horse-block or Loupin'-on-stane; used to aid a person to mount a horse in times past. This large sandstone block also has a concavity in its upper surface which is reminiscent of the 'plague stones' which would be filled with vinegar or sour wine into which money could be placed either as gifts to the church or as gifts to the sick, and help stop the spread of infection. An example also survives at Greystoke in Cumbria.

== In media ==
Sir Walter Scott makes several references to the Earl of Glencairn as a supporter of the Scottish kirk and the Cameronians in his novel Waverley. He also mentions in the same novel, that Kilmaurs Mains farm has excellent breeds of cattle. It is also apparent that the highland clan chiefs did very well out of the 'Highland Host' phenomenon; building extensions or new houses for themselves out of the profits from their plunder.

== See also ==
- Kilmarnock
- Kilmaurs Castle
- Kilmaurs place
- Kilmaurs railway station
- Lady's Well
- Laigh Milton viaduct
- Lambroughton
- Maak's or Monk's Well
- Stewarton
- Lands of Tour and Kirkland
