= Maak's or Monk's Well =

Coordinates: 55°38′2.2″N 4°31′10.7″W

The Maak's or Monk's Well is situated beside the Carmel Water in Kilmaurs, East Ayrshire. (NS 4114 4112), Scotland. A possible 'Holy Well', it was once a public water supply for the villagers and residents of the old castle at Kilmaurs Place.

Location of the Maak's or Monk's Well, Kilmaurs, East Ayrshire

== Introduction ==
The Maak's, Mack's or Monk's Well's waters once ran into the Carmel Water beneath Kilmaurs Place within the Morton Park, Kilmaurs. Originally it may have supplied the residents of Kilmaurs Place.

The well is mentioned as being a source of water for the village in 1709 and 1831. It was maintained as a public water supply using council funds.

Famous for never drying up even in the driest summer, despite the great demands once placed upon it by the locals, in 2013 the well ceased running into the Carmel Water, possibly following damage incurred whilst new railings were being installed alongside path and the bank of the Carmel Burn.

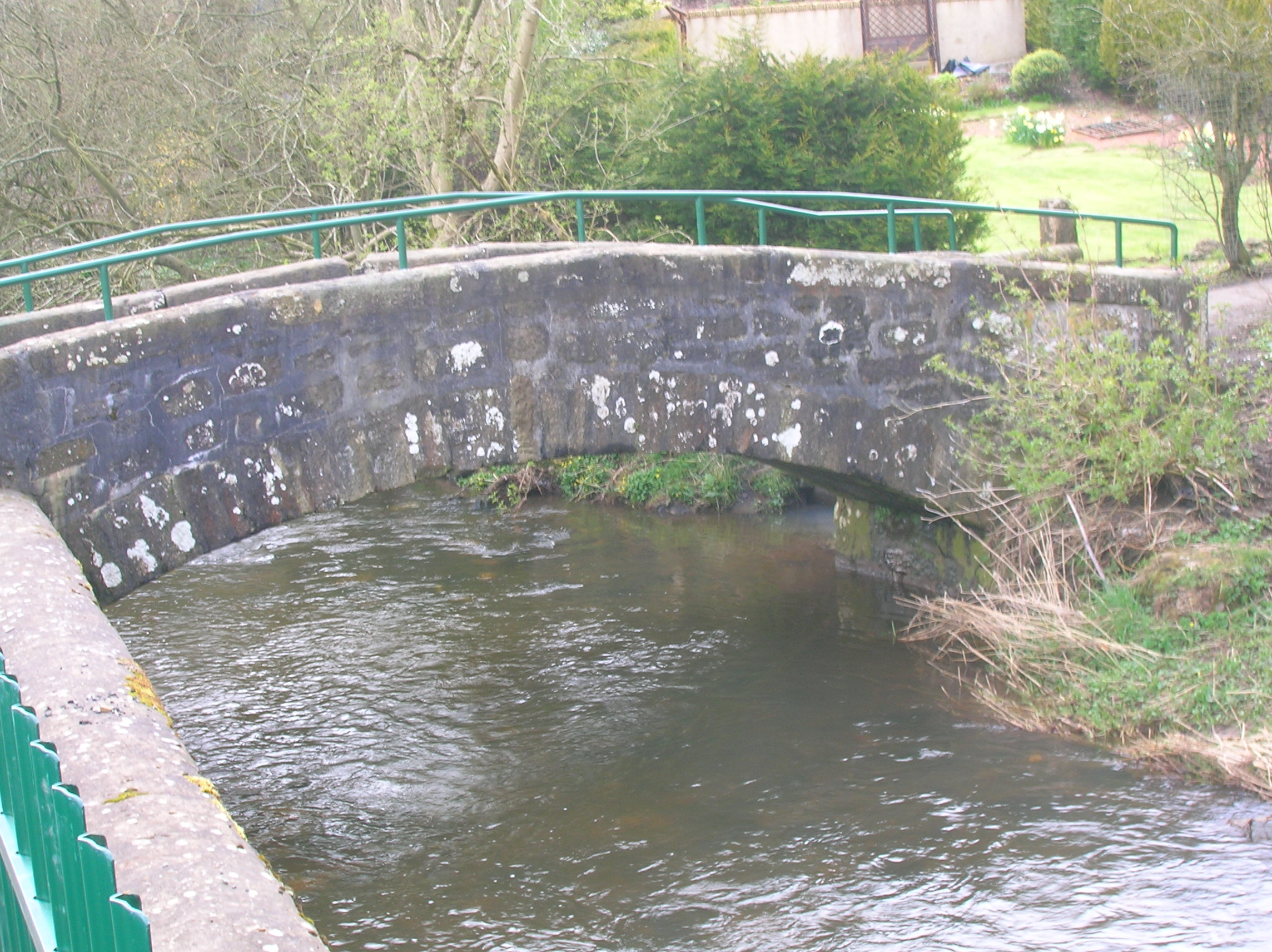
The old 'Brig' over the Carmel Water in Morton Park below Kilmaurs Place.

== Description ==
The source is now capped with a large stone slab (55.637669 -4.528186) and sits set into what is now the Kilmaurs Glencairn Bowling Club's boundary hedge. An underground pipe runs from the well to the wall of the Carmel Water from whence the overflow water once poured into the Carmel Water.

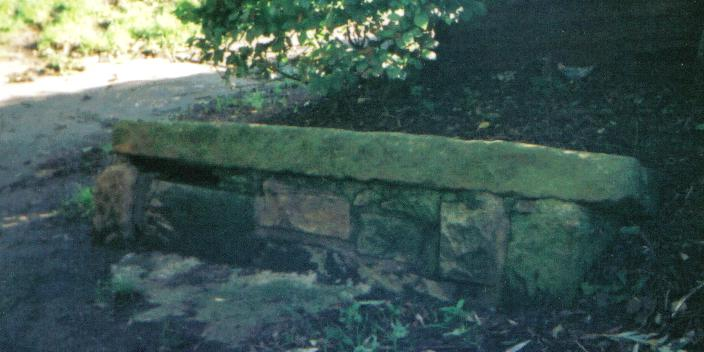
A view of the Maak's Well below Kilmaurs Place and next to the Kilmaurs Glencairn Bowling Club.

The OS maps show that the Maak's ell was important enough to have direct prioritised pedestrian paths running to it from the north and west.

== History ==
It is said that many years ago the local laird tried to prevent the local people from using the Maak's Well and it dried up until he changed his mind, but ran continuously until recent times. The laid had consulted the local priest who had advised "Restore the well to the people, let them come with their pitchers, and the waters will flow as yore."

Stepping stones gave access from the other bank until a footbridge was built in 1824; stepping stones remained on the western approach for some time after. The local pronunciation is closer to 'Mank's well.

It may have once been considered as having curative properties for in April 1709 it is recorded as having been administered to a sick woman although the result is not recorded. In 1831 it was recorded as the 'Macks Well' and the name 'Monks' Well' is a corruption of the former although pronounced locally as 'Manks Well'.

As stated, in 1824 a fine stone pedestrian bridge replaced the old stepping stones, however in 1825 the proprietors of the lands leading to the well tried to block access, even though this would have at one time been part of the common lands. The matter was fortunately settled with recourse to law.

In the summer of 1826 the Carmel Water almost dried up, but the Maak's Well did not, and locals farmers brought their carts up the dry riverbed to collect water in barrels, etc. A horse bolted and the driver, a lady, hit her head against the bridge with such force that she was killed. In 1843 two women crossing the bridge whilst carrying a heavy load between them fell into the Carmel and one was unfortunately drowned.

In 1849 the burgh bailies requested that the Earl of Eglinton should help repair the road and embankment that led to the Maak's Well, adding that local tradition suggested that the path had been originally built by a 'religious establishment'.

In 1879 David Landsborough describes the local wells and springs, including the Maak's Well. John Smith in the 1890s refers to the Monk's Well, however this may actually be a reference to the Lady's Well near the church.

In 1912 Duncan McNaught reported that thanks to the introduction of a 'gravitation water supply' the Maak's Well had recently been 'closed up'.

== See also ==
- Kilmaurs Place
- River Irvine
- Lady's Well, Auchmannoch
