= Kilmaurs Castle =

Castle in East Ayrshire, Scotland

- Kilmaurs, East Ayrshire, Scotland; UK grid reference NS 42027 40849
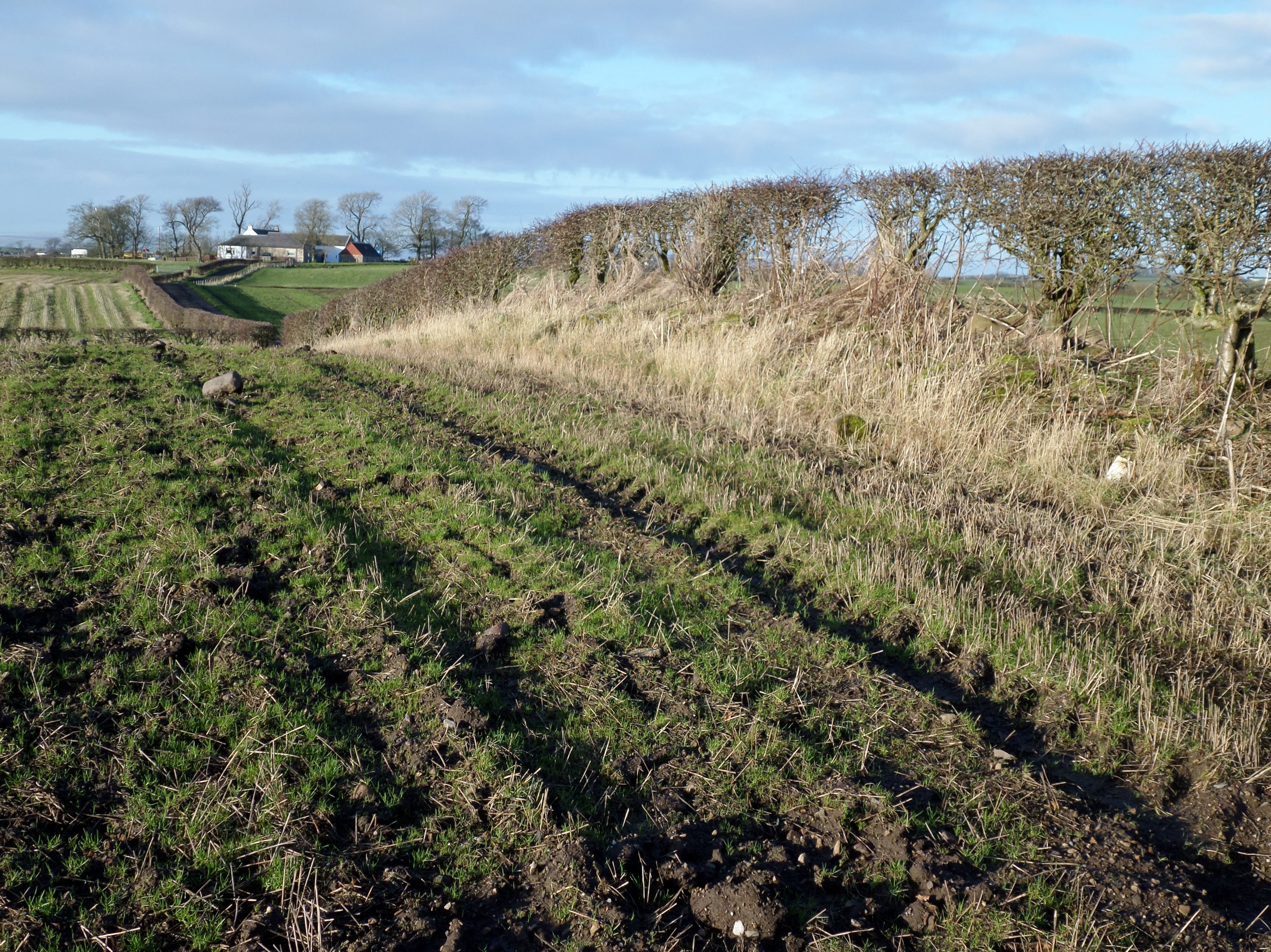
- Field clearance stones at the site of Kilmaurs Castle

Site information
- Type: A tower castle
- Owner: Jocksthorn Farm
- Open to the public: Yes
- Condition: Demolished and 'robbed'

Location
- Kilmaurs Castle
- Location within Scotland
- Coordinates: 55.635480°N 4.511272°W

Site history
- Built by: The De Morville or Cunninghame family
- Materials: Stone

Kilmaurs Castle was located on the lands of Jocksthorn Farm, near Kilmaurs in East Ayrshire, Scotland. It is described by Timothy Pont in the early 17th century as "Ye castell is ane ancient ftronge building belonging to ye Earls of Glencairne environed with a fair park called Carmell wod from ye vatter of Carmell yat runs by it." Dobie goes on to state that "The old baronial manor place is supposed to have been situated about a mile south-east of Kilmaurs, where some ruins can still be pointed out on the farm of Jakisthorn or Jock's-thorn, probably the original Villam de Cuninghame - the first possession of the family." The castle is not to be confused with the later Cunninghame family possession known as Kilmaurs Place which Dobie calls "..comparatively modern" in 1876.

== History ==
McNaught's Map of Kilmaurs Parish.

The castle would have been originally held by the De Morville family. In 1527 Cuthbert Cunninghame is said to have lived at both Jocksthorn and The Place, "assuming that Jocksthorn is indeed Kilmaurs Castle and that the now ruined late-16th or early-17th range at The Place was itself preceded by an earlier building. After the building of the later Place, the castle must have quickly fallen into disuse and decay."

The map by Timothy Pont from circa 1600 shows a typical tower castle within an enclosure with a second area of enclosed woodland running up beside the Carmell Water. A mill is indicated and the dwelling of 'Karmel-Wood' is marked, a farm of that name surviving today (2015). The site is named 'Kilmaers' and lies to the south of the church. Only one tower is indicated in the area and Jocksthorn is not shown. Kilmaurs Castle is the only site in the area shown to have a second wooded enclosure.

In 1612 John Monipennie stated that Kilmaurs Castle was the residence of the Earls of Glencairn, indicating that Kilmaurs Place had not yet been constructed at least not in the form of a suitable residence.

Moll's map of the early 1700s shows the castle but no enclosures. Jocksthorn and Kilmaurs Place are not shown.

The Statistical Account of 1791-99 says of the Earl of Glencairn "that noble family then resided in this parifh, where they had a houfe, fome fmall ruins of which yet remain on the farm which is called Jock's-thorn, near to the road leading from Stewarton to Kilmarnock, ..."

Roys military map of the area dating from the 1750s indicates a large area of probable woodland/land that is not being cultivated where Kilmaurs Castle is said to have once stood. Armstrong's map of 1775 indicates a castle-style building at the supposed site although the name 'Jock's Thorn' appears to be linked with it.

Adamson relates in 1875 that the ancient castle was in the vicinity of Jackisthorn, Jock's or Jack's Thorn farm, now 'Jocksthorn' and several old people from Kilmaurs in 1875 remembered playing amongst the ruined remnants of masonry which occupied the site of this old castle of the Cunninghames.

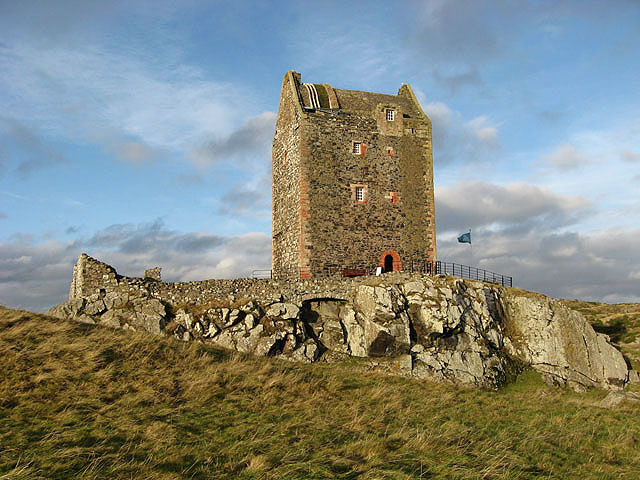
A typical Scottish Tower Castle at Smailholm.

Adamson also talks of the typical woodland policies of such a dwelling still existing in the 1870s with venerable old trees, what sounds like roundels of trees, avenues that may have defined lanes or rides, etc. All of these are not normally associated with farms and he appears to clinch the argument of the castles site by describing the "..sward covered circular mound" or motte at the 'traditional' site.

In 1884-6 the Ordnance Gazetteer of Scotland records that "... a neighbouring farm, Jock's Thorn, contains vestiges of the original or more ancient residence of the Glencairn family, to whom Kilmaurs gave the title of Baron both while they were Earls of Glencairn and for 53 years earlier."

The RCAHMS records cartographic evidence of a castellated building at this site, probably a typical Scottish tower castle.

The lack of stone on the site and the clear written records of ruins at this precise location indicate a high degree of 'robbing' for use in building projects such as Jocksthorn Farm, The Place and other sites. The old castle stood on a lane that provided easy transport of building materials to other sites.

=== Other site evidence ===
The term 'Thorn' in Jocksthorn may derive from 'torn, thorn, a tower', as in Jocks-Thorn on Cumbrae, "alias Jock-Torn; and head, an eminence; hence tower-hill." 'Thorn' occurs in words meaning ‘assembly’, ‘meeting place’ and ‘piece of land' or ‘clearing’.

The traditional site has a great deal of field clearance stones laid along the line of the hedge leading to Jocksthorn Farm where medieval coins have been found.

Although the site is not set in a strong defensive position it has exceptional views of the surrounding area as shown in the gallery below.

Views from the Site of Kilmaurs Castle

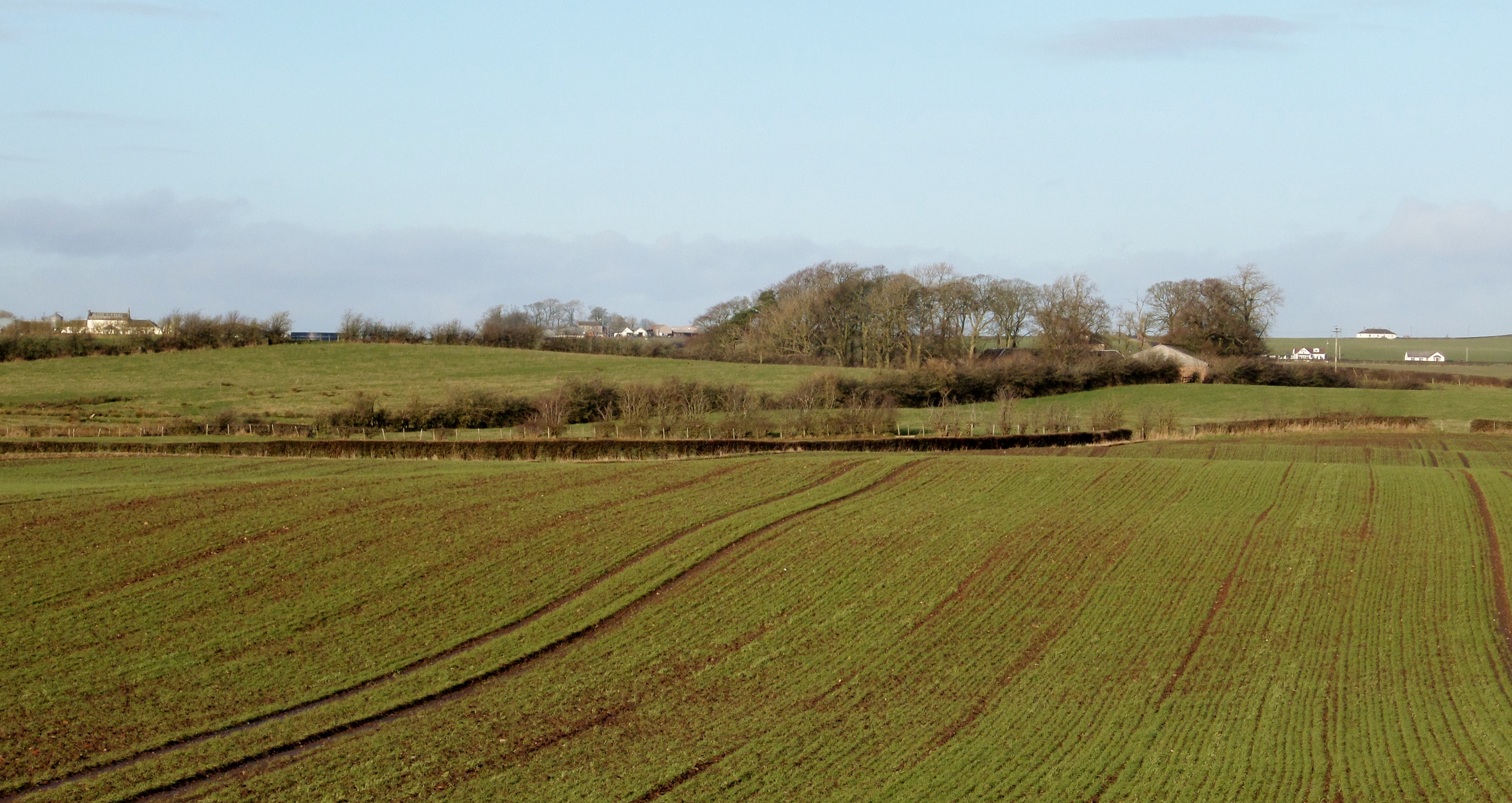
Bellsland Farm and the view to the north-east.

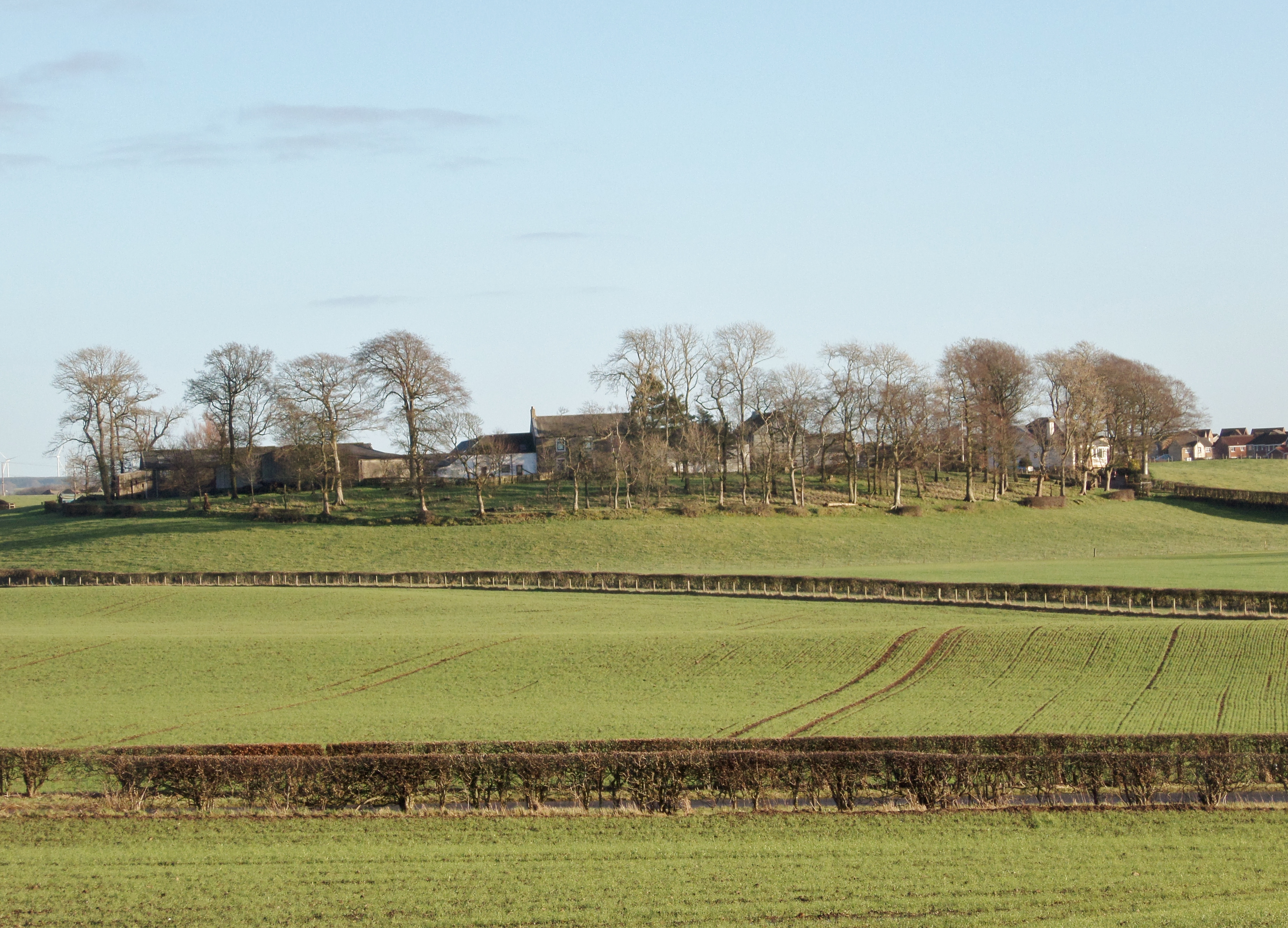
Grassmillside Farm and the view to the south-east.

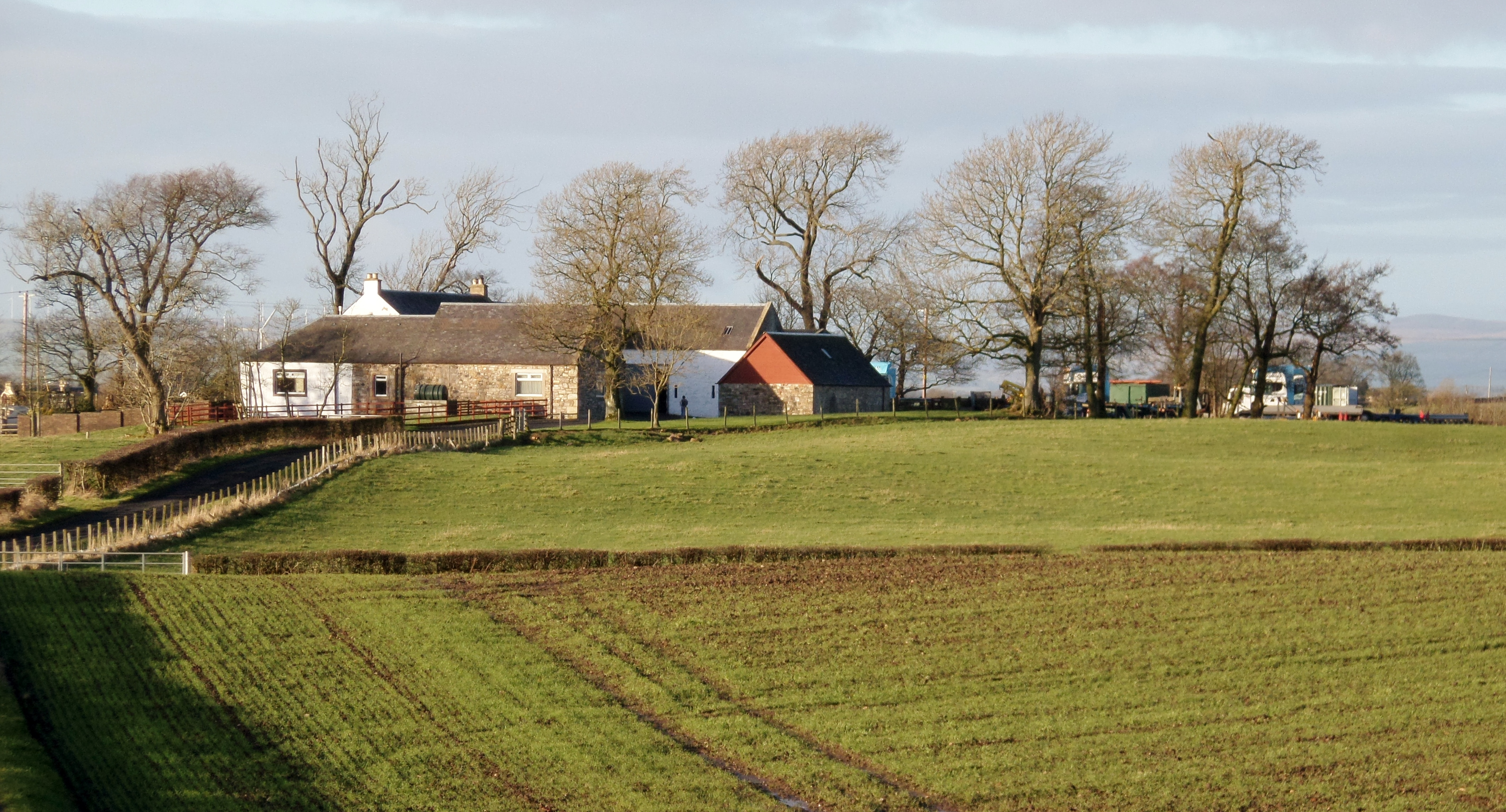
Jocksthorn Farm and the view to the north-west.

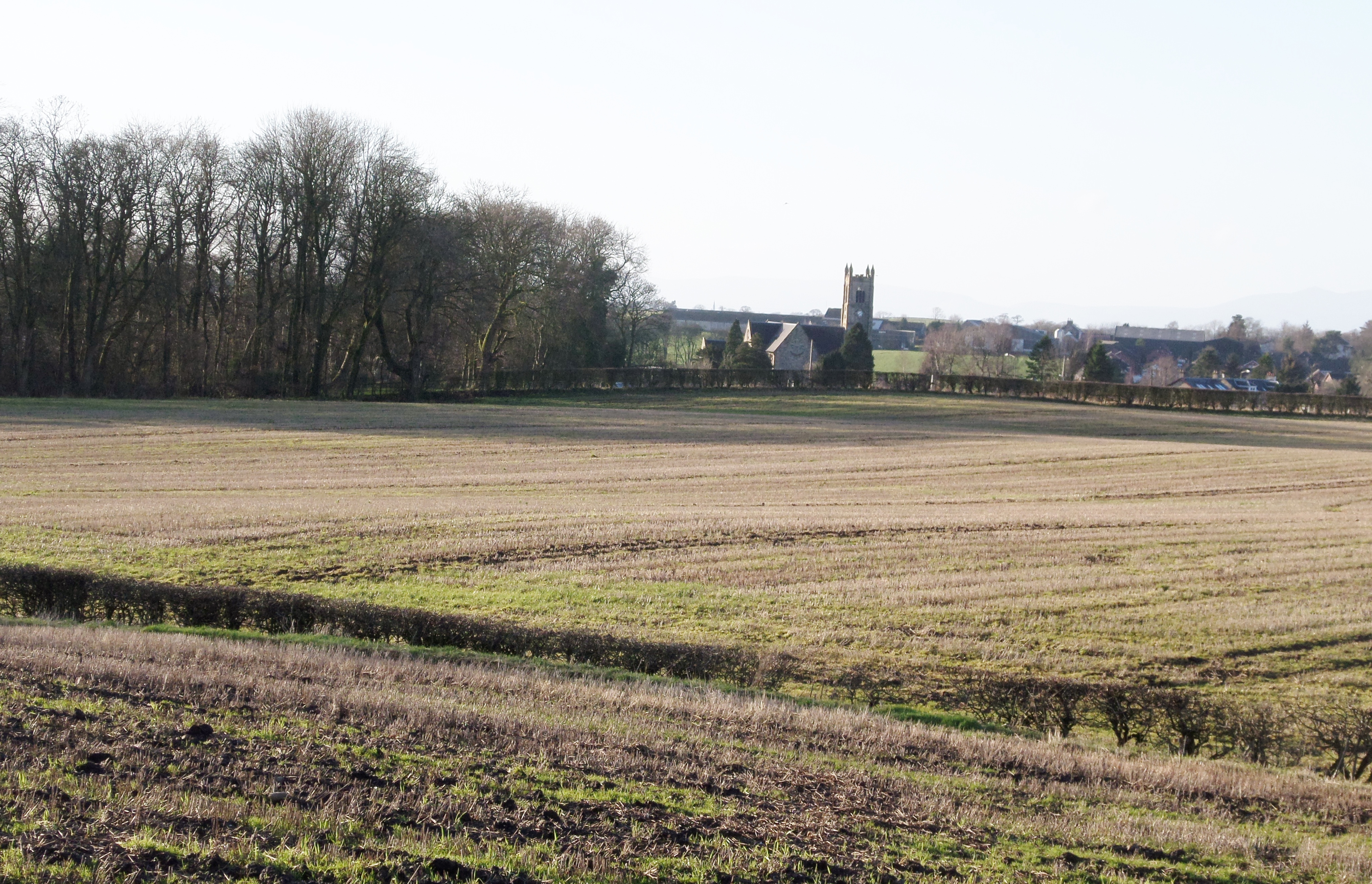
St Maurs-Glencairn church, Tour and the view south-west.

The RCAHMS Canmore site records that "Slight undulations suggest previous disturbance and many large, shapeless stones are dumped against an adjacent hedge. The farmer at Jocksthorn reports that this is a difficult, stony area to plough, ..."

Davis records that the local farmer has noted that pottery and stones are brought up by ploughing at an elevated spot (NS 417 411) off the old entrance to Jocksthorn farm at a point east of both Tour House and Jock's Thorn.

Metal detectorists have found a number of medieval coins in this area amongst what may be old building and foundation stones. The 19th-century 6 inch OS Map of Kilmaurs marks the supposed site of Kilmaurs Castle as lying off the side of the farm road leading to Jocksthorn Farm from the old Stewarton Road.

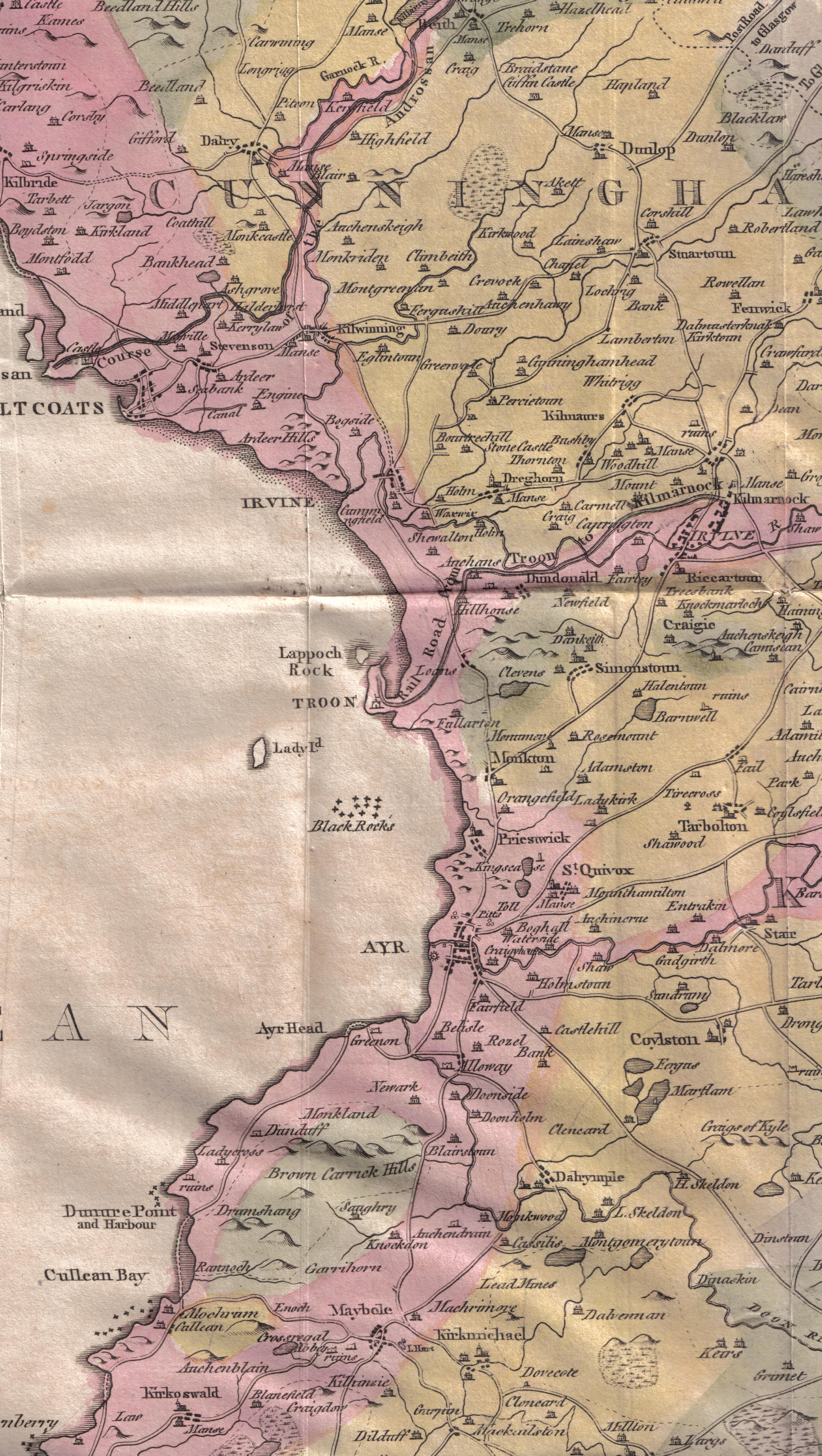
William Aiton's map of 1811 showing the site of the ruins of Kilmaurs Castle near Jocksthorn.

Dobie in 1874 that the old baronial residence was about a mile South-East of Kilmaurs and ruins could still be pointed out on the farmlands of Jocksthorn.

Etymology
Carmel, the oldest form of which is Caremuall, is thought to be derived, according to McNaught, from the Gaelic 'Car' meaning a 'fort', and 'Meall'. meaning a hill. Therefore, 'The fort on the hill'.

== Micro-history ==
Dobie records that the castle stood within a park known as 'Carmell Wood' after the Carmell Water'. A farm known as Carmellwood is located to the north-east of the castle site.

The Tour Burn runs underground in a culvert from the Stewarton road near Grassmillside to near the corner of the neighbouring field lying next to the Tour woodland policies. It is not recorded if this is related to the requirements of agriculture in some way connected with the castle and its motte, associated grounds, garden, etc.

The site is nearly two miles from Kilmarnock and four miles from Stewarton.

== See also ==
- Kilmaurs Place
- Kilmaurs
- Lady Well
- Lands of Tour and Kirkland
