= Lady Well =

Holy well in Glasgow, Scotland

Coordinates: 55.8608°N 4.2324°W

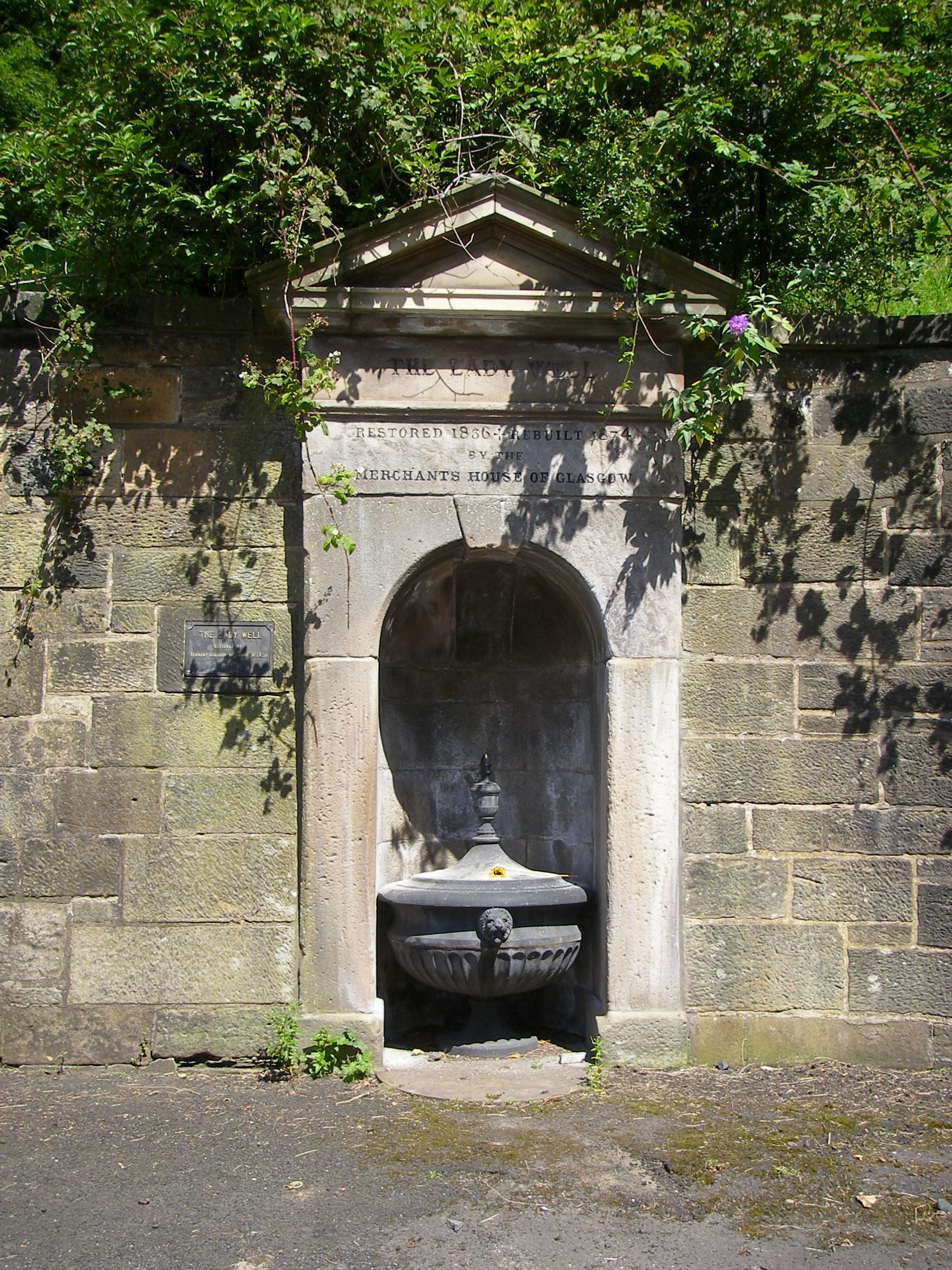
The Lady Well

The Lady Well is a holy well to the south of Glasgow Necropolis in Dennistoun, Glasgow in Scotland. It was the last public well in Glasgow. It gave its name to the adjacent Ladywell St., and the modern day Ladywell area which is considered a sub-district of Dennistoun.

== History ==
Also known as 'Our Lady's Well', Glasgow's Ladywell is an artesian spring noted on early city maps and can be reliably assumed to predate the city. It lay just outside the city wall and Drygate Port in medieval times and will have refreshed Romans traveling the old Carntyne Highway east-west between forts along the Antonine Wall. Today it is erroneously believed to have been sunk for use of commoners denied access to a nearby Priest's Well, and/or to have been capped in the early 19th century out of fears of pollution or plague.

Its wellhead was jointly rebuilt by the Merchants House and City Council in 1835-6 for enclosure in a new wall when the Fir Park behind it was turned into a gardened burial ground. While most wells in Glasgow were closed after freshwater piped from Loch Katrine transformed the city's health and sanitation in the 1860s, the Ladywell remained open for the public. An old article says the Ladywell was the last public well to be closed but gives no date. The classical wellhead installed by the 1836 restoration bears no resemblance to the original - an open round one - and remains there today. The current lintel stone (its second) notes the 1836 rebuild and another by the Merchant's House in 1874. A plaque commemorates its most recent refurbishment by Tennent Caledonian Breweries in 1983. The Ladywell remains capped.

== See also ==
- Scottish Reformation
