= Lady's Well =

Lady's Well or Our Lady's Well is a common name in the United Kingdom and Ireland for a holy well, usually dedicated to the Virgin Mary.

Examples include:

- Lady's Well, Auchmannoch
- Dundalk § Places of interest
- Effin § Wells
- Gwladys's well in Tredegar
- Hermitage, Dorset
- Holystone, Northumberland
- Honiley § History
- Ladywell Fields § History of the park
- Lancing, West Sussex § Location
- Lands of Tour and Kirkland § Lady's Well
- Mevagissey § History
- Mulhuddart § Built heritage
- Newtowncashel § Attractions
- Our Lady's Well, Hempsted
- Roman Catholic Archdiocese of Tuam § Local pilgrimages
- Slane Castle § History
- Stow of Wedale § The church
- Wellingborough § History
- Woolpit § Our Lady of Woolpit

== See also ==
- Lady Well
- Ladywell
