= Knockentiber =

Village in East Ayrshire, Scotland

Knockentiber (Scottish Gaelic: Cnoc an Tobair, hill of the well) is a village in East Ayrshire, Parish of Kilmaurs, Scotland. Knockentiber is two miles (three kilometres) west-northwest of Kilmarnock and 1/2 mile (800 metres) northeast of Crosshouse. Latitude:55.6193°N Longitude:4.5455°W and grid reference NS397392. The population was 359 in 1991, however the population is much higher following the construction of several housing estates (2007). In the 18th and 19th and mid 20th centuries the locality was a highly industrialised coal mining district. The settlement is on the Carmel Burn, which runs into the River Irvine, around one mile (1.5 kilometres) to the south.

== Introduction ==
McNaught's map of the Parish of Kilmaurs 1912

Knockentiber lies on the old toll road from Kilmaurs to Crosshouse, with a junction for Kilmarnock and a country road leading to Busbiehill, West Plann, Southhook and ultimately the Cunninghamhead and Perceton districts. A minor road branches off for Busbiehill and Knockentiber.

== History ==
Ainslie's map of 1822 marks the site of the settlement as Bushby, although a "Knockintiber" is marked as being nearby. The name "Knokmdybir" is marked on Pont's map of 1604, but no mention is made of Busbie. Armstrong's map of 1775, shows both Busbie as a ruin with woodland policies and Knockentiber as a separate settlement nearby. The 1860 OS shows that a pre-reformation chapel dedicated to the Virgin Mary was situated close to the site of Busbie Castle. A small hamlet of thatched cottages was also clustered near the castle, making this a distinct settlement at that time. In 1860 the OS shows "Old Busbie" on the opposite side of the road from the site of the castle. Busbie and Knockentiber progressively grew together over the years.

Etymology
The name Knockentiber, is thought to be derived, according to McNaught, from 'the hillock of the well', and Busbie, 'the town of the bushes', being partly Old Norse in origin.

Busbie is more or less an alternative name for the area until the Royal Mail reorganised its postal districts in the 1930s when many hamlets and other localities ceased to exist in the eyes of that body. Busbiehill, Busbie mains, Busbie holdings, Busbie cottages and Busbiehead are still extant nearby.

Archibald Adamson walking through the area in 1875 remarks on the handsome railway bridge and his view of the Plann estate and the extensive fireclay works of John McNight and Son, the senior partner being the owner of the estate of Plann. A pit had been sunk near the mansion house and to the surprise of all the experts, good quality ironstone was found. Top quality coal and fireclay were also found in the vicinity. He describes Knockentiber as being a row of old houses occupied by miners.

Laigh Milton viaduct over the River Irvine is situated near Gatehead, a few miles away on the other side of Crosshouse. This is the oldest railway viaduct in Scotland and one of the oldest in the World.

=== Busbie Castle ===
Location of Knockentiber

Busbie Castle circa 1866. Paterson

Knockentiber was close to several country estates which provided employment and helped create the need for the establishment of settlements such as Knockentiber. The old castle, a ruin since at least the 1770s was demolished in 1949 or 1952 H. Ritchie had Busbie House erected as a replacement for the old castle. Busbie Estates and Collective Securities Limited owned a fair amount of land as late as the 1950s.

=== Knockentiber's greenhills ===
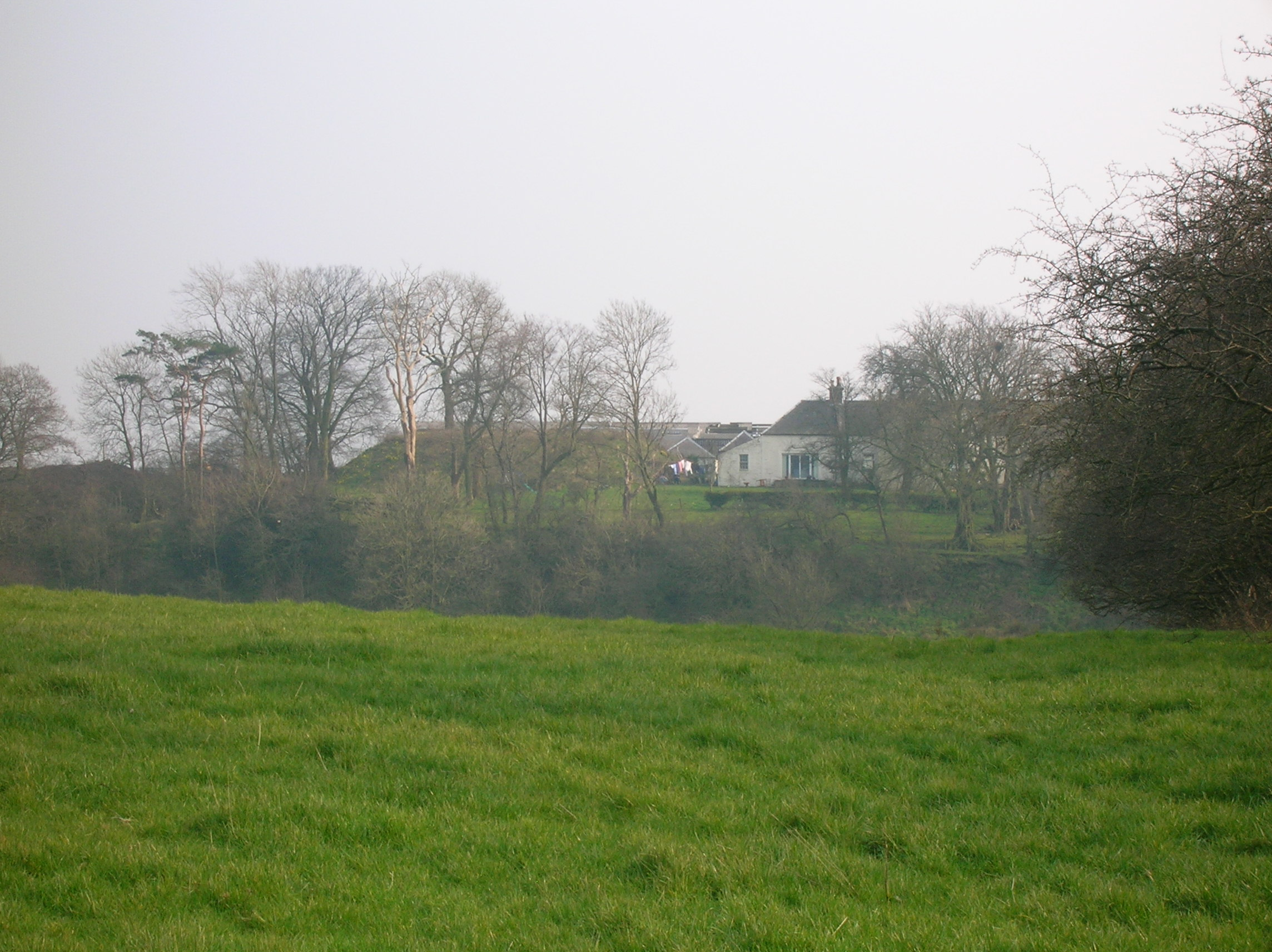
The large Tumulus or Mound at Greenhill Farm. 2007.

At the back of Greenhill farm, on the top of a steep bank in a circular mound about 21 m in diameter and 4 m in height. It may be an ancient barrow or tumulus. Some years before 1875 several stone coffins were found in a tumulus in a field, called 'Mound field' in 1912 on Waterpark farm. There had been two mounds on this side of the Carmel and the other one at Greenhill. The Waterpark mounds contained many stones, having an appearance of neither having been water worn or weathered; no trace of these two mounds now exists. The headless skeleton of a large man was found about five feet down in the Greenhill mound and this led to speculation that a 'Battle of Kilmaurs' had taken place nearby between King Macbeth and Malcolm III, known as Malcolm Canmore. Malcolm was the son of the murdered King Duncan and on this occasion he was forced to escape to his castle at Corsehill in Stewarton. He was nearly captured by MacBeth's soldiers, however a peasant named Friskin hid him by covering him with straw, hence the "Over Fork over" motto of the Cunninghames and Stewarton.

Whilst sinking a well at the edge of the mound in the 19th century the workmen found large quantities of chaff and charred wood. This suggests that the hill had been extensively used for 'shillin' or 'sheiling', this being the winnowing of corn before the invention of fanners. The finding of stones of steadily increasing size suggests that another grave lies beneath. When the railway was built a stone coffin was unearthed, similar to those in the Waterpark mounds.

=== Diehard's raid on Greenhill Farm ===
James Paterson, the historian, relates that Greenhill Farm was then owned by Bailie Finnie, an unpopular man, due to his officious handling of the radical disturbances of the time. In 1829, one William Brown, known as 'Diehard' due to his army experiences, led a hungry mob to Greenhill which was known to hold considerable hoarded supplies of meal and grain. The farm domestics were taken by surprise, no difficulty was encountered in obtaining the food supplies and no wanton damage perpetrated. On the return journey to Kilmarnock the mob met with Bailie Finnie and the local constables, resulting in a 'battle' in which stones were for the most part the weapons of choice. In the meantime the cart of meal and grain was taken to the town centre and the food was handed out to the needy. Despite the boldest of the act, only a few stragglers were punished by the sheriff and William Brown, 'Diehard' himself, got off scot free.

== The Barony of Robertoun ==
This barony, once part of the Barony of Kilmaurs, ran from Kilmaurs south to the River Irvine. It had no manor house and belonged to the Eglinton family latterly. Hugh Montgomerie, Ist Earl of Eglinton, had a charter on 3 February 1499 from James V of the £40 lands of old extent of Roberton in Cunninghame. These lands were part of the Lands and Barony of Ardrossan; the following properties were part of the barony: parts of Kilmaurs, Knockentiber, Craig, Gatehead, Woodhills, Greenhill, Altonhill, Plann, Hayside, Thorntoun, Rash-hill Park, Milton, Windyedge, Fardelhill, Muirfields, Corsehouse.

=== Thorntoun and other estates ===
Thorntoun house and estate, including Carmel Bank, previously a Cuninghame property lies towards Springside. It was home to various families, such as the Montgomeries, Ross's, Mures, Cuninghame's, Peebles, Wreys and Sturrocks, before becoming a school, opened by Barnardo's in September 1971 for children with emotional difficulties aged 11 to 16 years. The school closed in 1990 and Thorntoun finally became a nursing home. Groome refers to a mansion house at Knockentiber circa 1885, but gives no further details.

=== The collieries, coal pits, brickworks and quarries ===
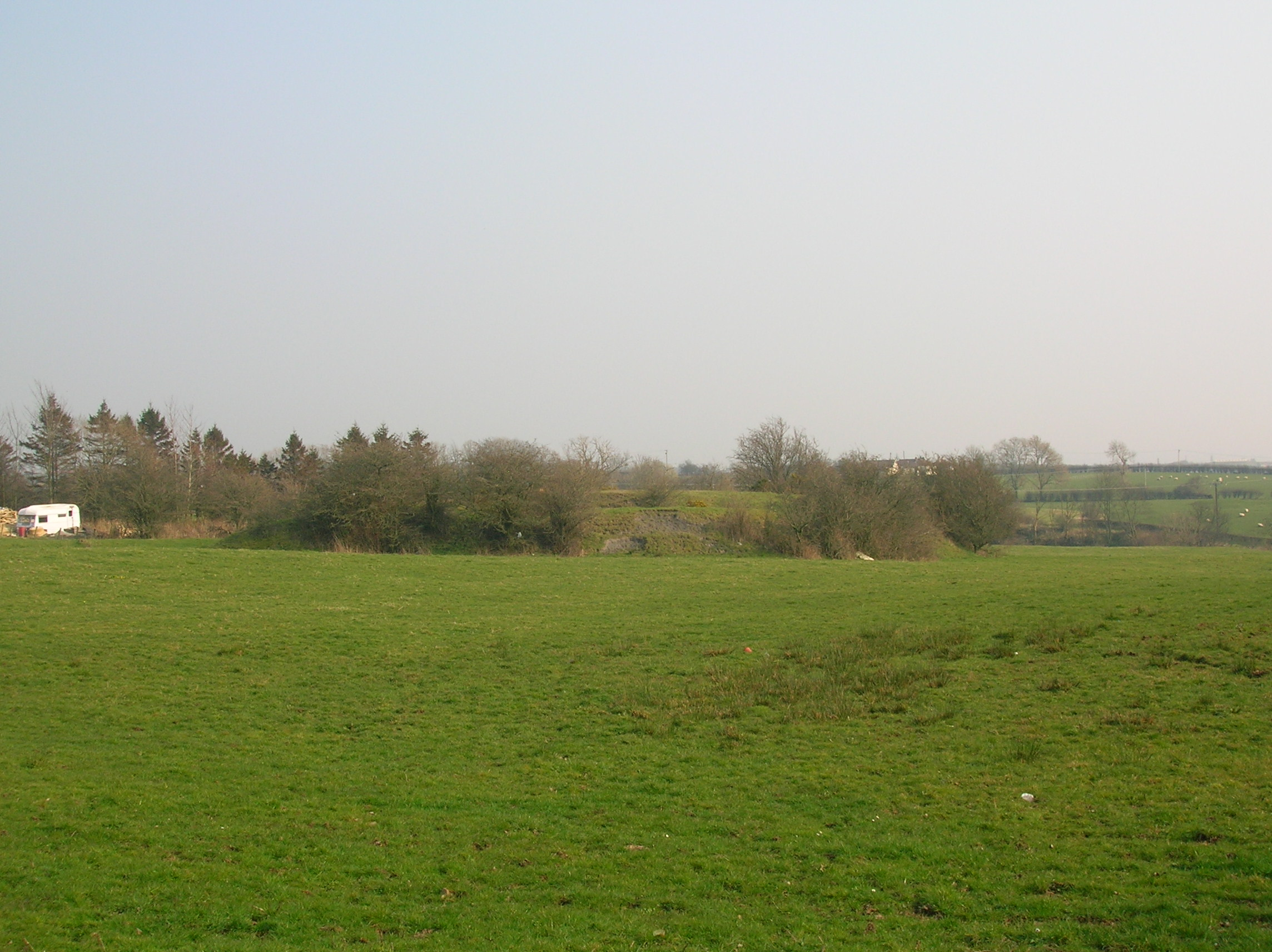
The site of Greenhill quarry from the main road. 2007.

The 1860, 1898 - 1904 and, 1923 and 1912 OS maps all show that the extent to which Knockentiber was surrounded by collieries, coal pits and freight only railway or 'tram' lines. Collieries were located near Busbie farm and Plann. These were served by standard gauge mineral railway lines, criss-crossing the countryside; they all now lifted, with only a few embankments left to indicate their original course. In 1860 numerous old and current coal pits dotted the area. The waste bings of Busbie Colliery still lie close to Busbie farm in the field across the road. Greenhill freestone quarry lay over towards Waterpark and several limekilns were present near the Carmel Ford, etc. J. & R. Howie had extracted coal and clay under licence from the National Coal Board in 1951. Tiles were made at the rail served Plann Brickworks and Balgray Bauxite Company had a small mine at Fardalehill. Quarry house still stands.

Plann Fireclay Works was a very large works making a range of products including salt-glazed sewer pipes. It had 14 downdraught kilns, some rectangular and some round, and at least one Newcastle kiln. This works closed in 1969, and was demolished in 1978. It was probably the largest works of its kind in Scotland.

=== Miner's rows ===
The county council in 1932 planned to demolish most of the old miners' rows, a local case being Southhook row near Southhook farm. the 1895 OS shows a Fardlehill miners row on the Kilmarnock side of the farm, near Ellerslie.

=== The railway ===
Crosshouse railway station opened on 4 April 1843 as Busby. Busby station had a short life and closed on 15 April 1850, however the station reopened as Crosshouse (then as part of the Glasgow and South Western Railway) on 1 September 1872.and closed permanently to passengers on 6 April 1964.

Busbie Junction branched off to the Glasgow, Paisley, Kilmarnock and Ayr Railway (G&SWR) Busbie Branch to Irvine via Springside and Dreghorn. A milestone near Busbie Junction on the bridge over the Carmel, shown on the 1860 OS map appears to read Glasgow 32 miles (51 km) and Gretna 84 miles (135 km).

The old railway from Kilmarnock to Irvine, branching off at Busbie Junction (Crosshouse station), has become a tarmaced cyclepath, maintained by Sustrans.

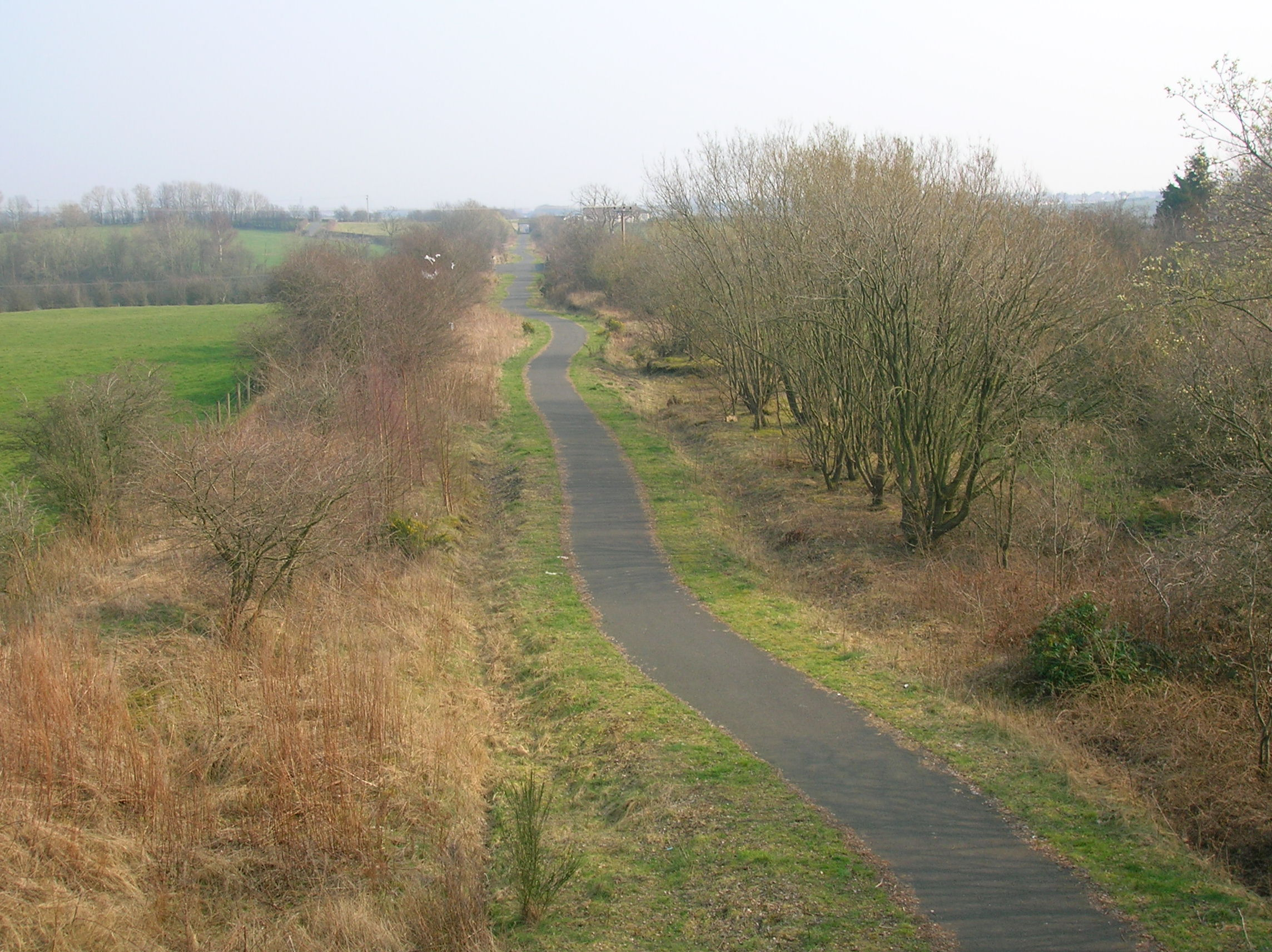
The Sustrans cyclepath looking towards Kilmarnock.

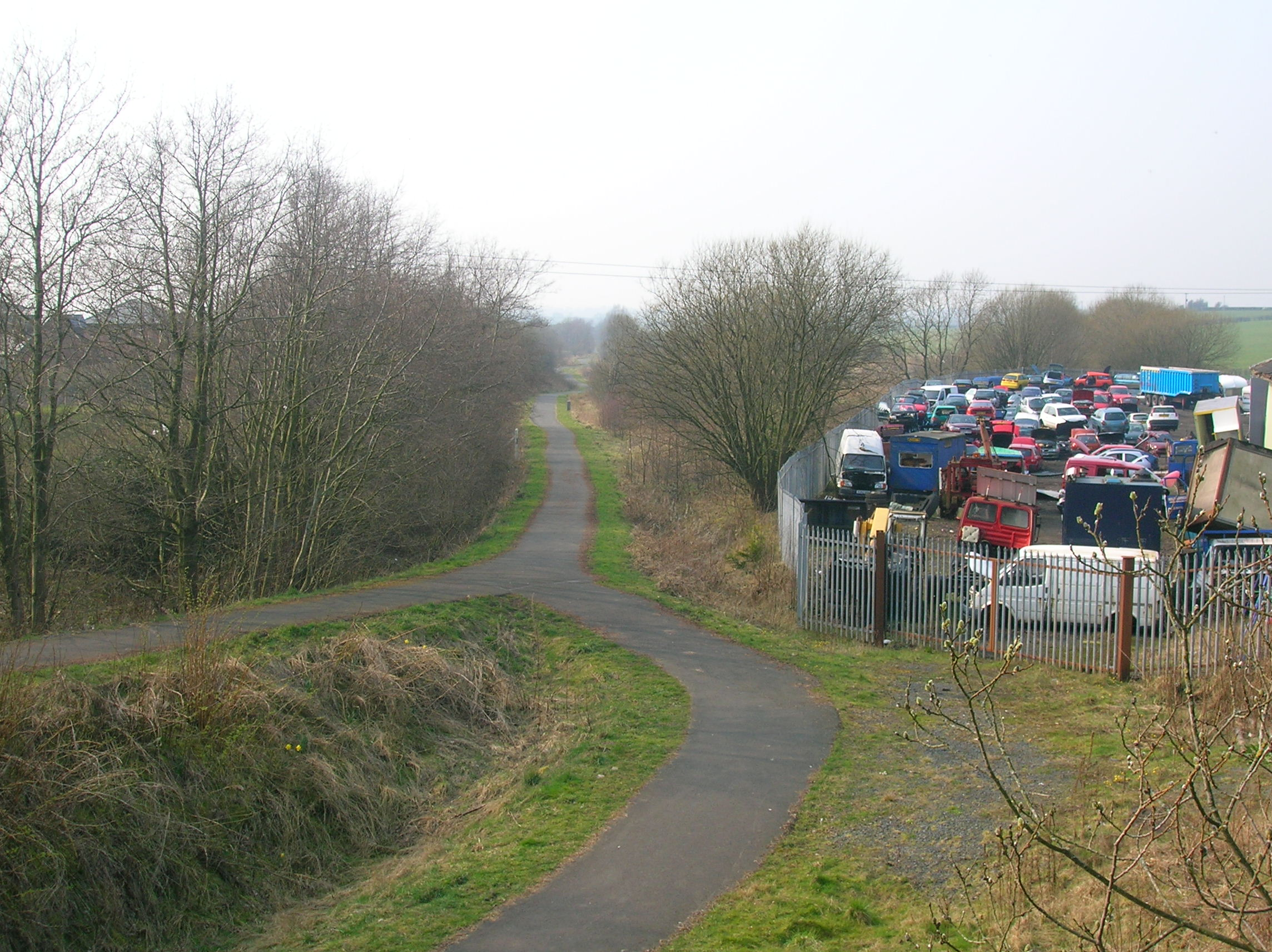
The site of Crosshouse station, now the Irvine cyclepath.

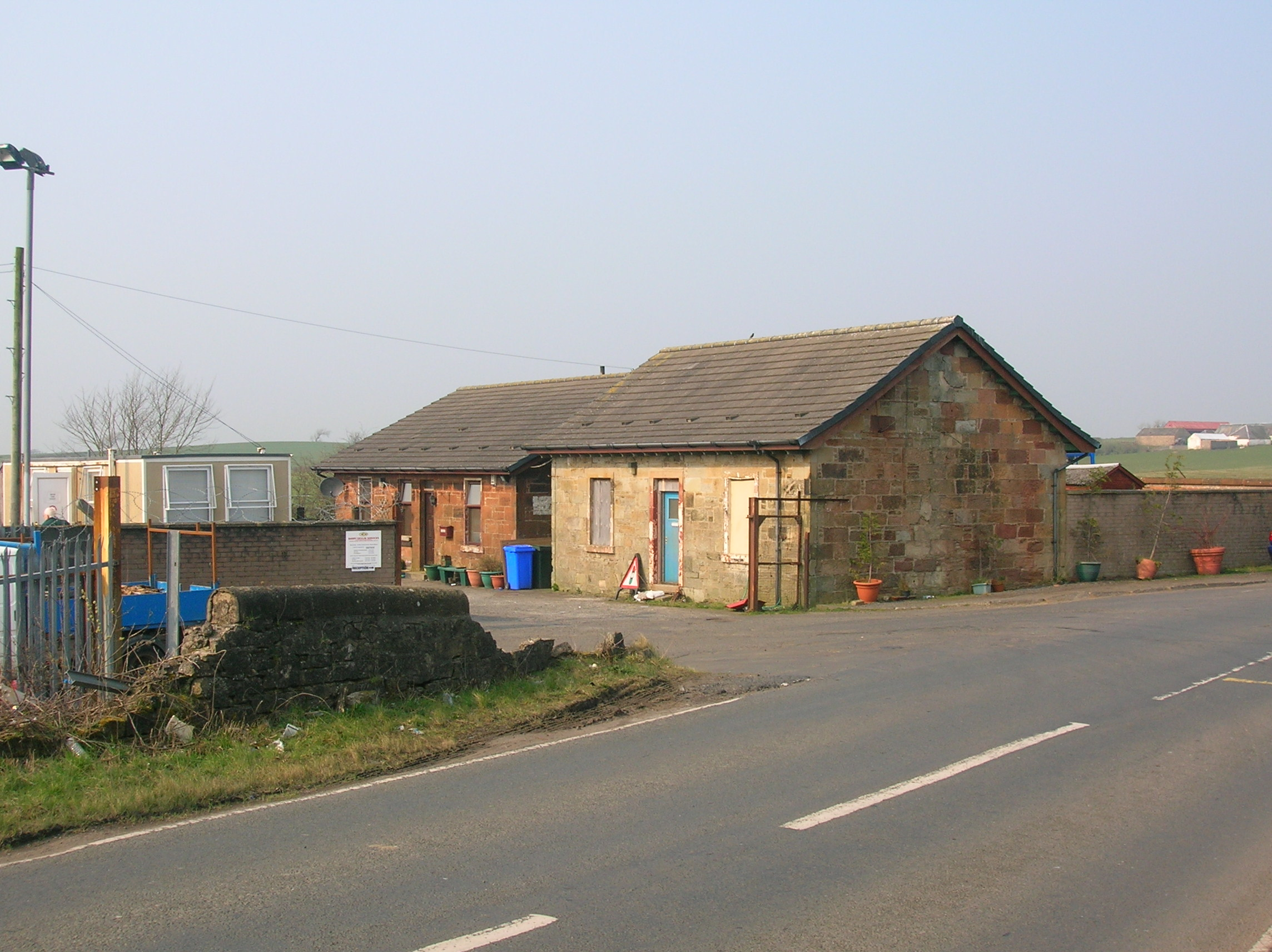
The old Goodstation buildings, now a scrapyard.

=== The turnpike ===
Knockentiber was on a toll road or turnpike; the nearest toll house being opposite the entrance to the old Goods station; the backwall of the building remaining as the field boundary. The name 'turnpike' originated from the original 'gate' used being just a simple wooden bar attached at one end to a hinge on the supporting post.

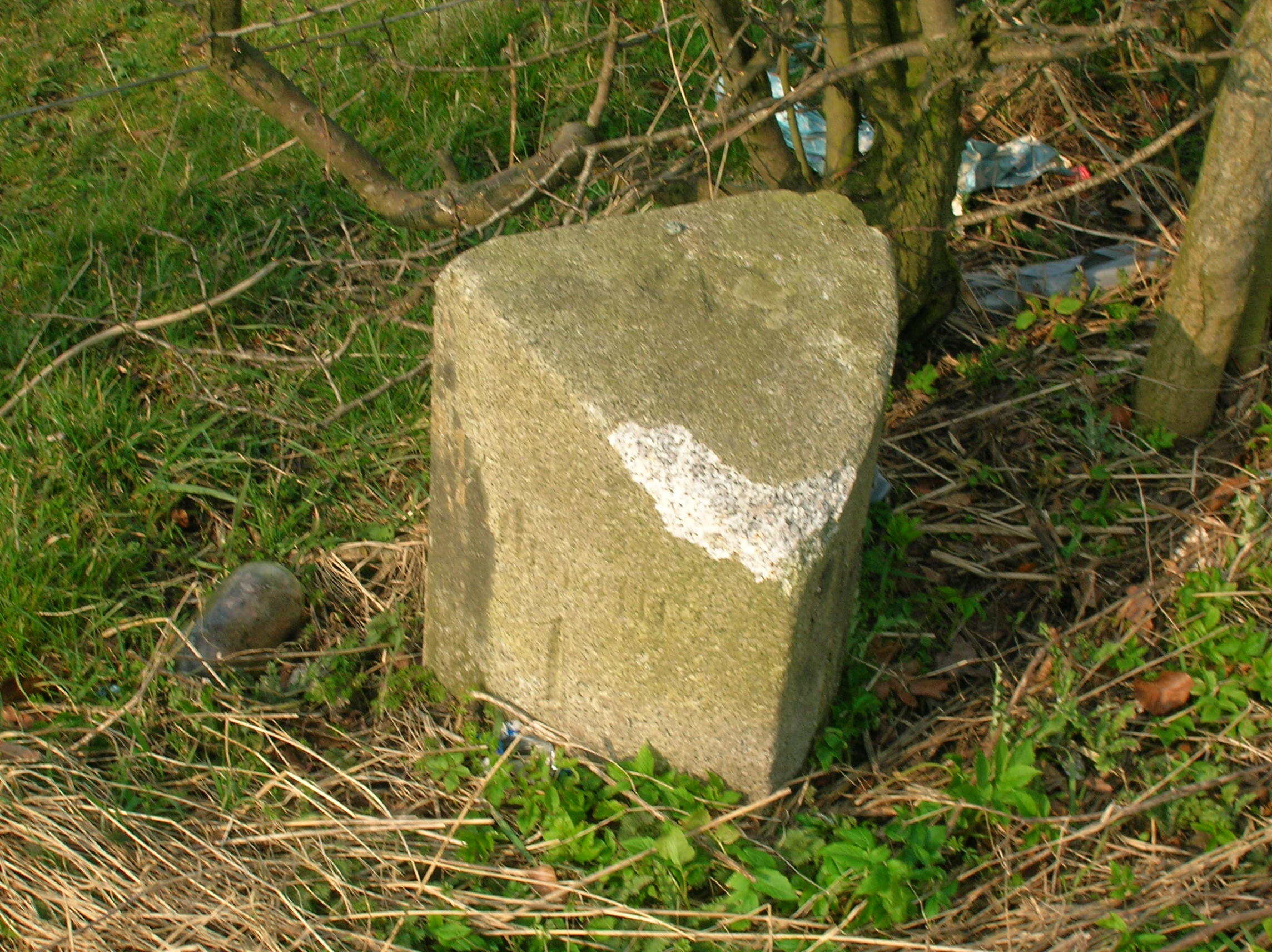
The Waterpark milestone showing damage from hedgecutting machinery.

The hinge allowed it to 'open' or 'turn' This bar looked like the 'pike' used as a weapon in the army at that time and therefore we get 'turnpike'. The term was also used by the military for barriers set up on roads specifically to prevent the passage of horses.

In addition to providing better surfaces and more direct routes, the turnpikes settled the confusion of the different lengths given to miles, which varied from 4,854 to nearly 7,000 feet (2,100 m). Long miles, short miles, Scotch or Scot's miles (5,928 ft), Irish miles (6,720 ft), etc. all existed. 5,280 feet (1,610 m) seems to have been an average! Another important point is that when these new toll roads were constructed the turnpike trusts went to a great deal of trouble to improve the route of the new road and these changes could be quite considerable as the old roads tended to go from farm to farm, hardly the shortest route. The tolls on roads were abolished in 1878 to be replaced by a road 'assessment', which was taken over by the county council in 1889.

Etymology
Carmel, the oldest form of which is Caremuall, is thought to be derived, according to McNaught, from the Gaelic 'Car' meaning a 'fort', and 'Meall'. meaning a hill. Therefore, 'The fort on the hill'.

Most milestones are no longer in situ and often the only remaining clue is an otherwise unexplained 'kink' in the line of a hedgerow. The milestones were buried during the Second World War so as not to provide assistance to invading troops, German spies, etc. This seems to have happened all over Scotland, however Fife was more fortunate than Ayrshire, for the stones were taken into storage and put back in place after the war had finished.

The 1860 OS does not indicate the milestone opposite Busbie farm, embedded in the tarmac of the pavement. It is marked on the circa 1983 OS map. This milestone is granite and has had its 'information' deleted by a coat of cement being applied to the surface, some of which has come off, revealing 'Crosshouse' and 'Kilmaurs'. This may have been by an assiduous workman 'blotting out' the information on a milestone which could not be buried easily; the fate of so many other milestones. Another milestone survives near to the entrance to Carmyle or Waterpark farm. It appears to have read Kilmaurs 1-mile (1.6 km) and Crosshouse 2 miles (3.2 km), the lettering is also obscured by a 'wash' of cement.

=== Farms ===
West Plann (previously Planne) and Greenhill are nearby. South Woodhill and Carmyle or Waterpark lies on the Kilmaurs side of the old railway. Fardalehill is on the Kilmarnock road and Fergushill lies towards West Plann and Busbie Mains.

=== Busbie Mill ===
The present Busbie farm is marked on the older maps, e.g. 1860, as a mill, with a clear millrace or lade and a sluice. The water was taken from the Carmel somewhere in the vicinity of a dwelling marked as Busbie Holm, rejoining the burn just beyond the mill. It is not clear as to when the mill ceased to operate. It is likely that the mill was associated with the Lairds of Busbie. A Robertown mill is known to have existed, named from the title of the Barony.

== Football club ==
Knockentiber has a history up to the present day (2007) of fielding very successful amateur football teams. The football pitch and associated facilities are literally at the centre of the community.

== Local history and traditions of the area ==
Strawhorn states in 1951 that a fair number of inhabitants are of Cornish extraction, having been brought up here to break a coal workers strike in the 1880s. They brought names like 'Chynoweth' with them, pronounced 'She-no-ef', Cornish or Kernewek for 'New House'.

Andrew Fisher from nearby Crosshouse was Prime Minister of Australia on three occasions in the early 1900s.

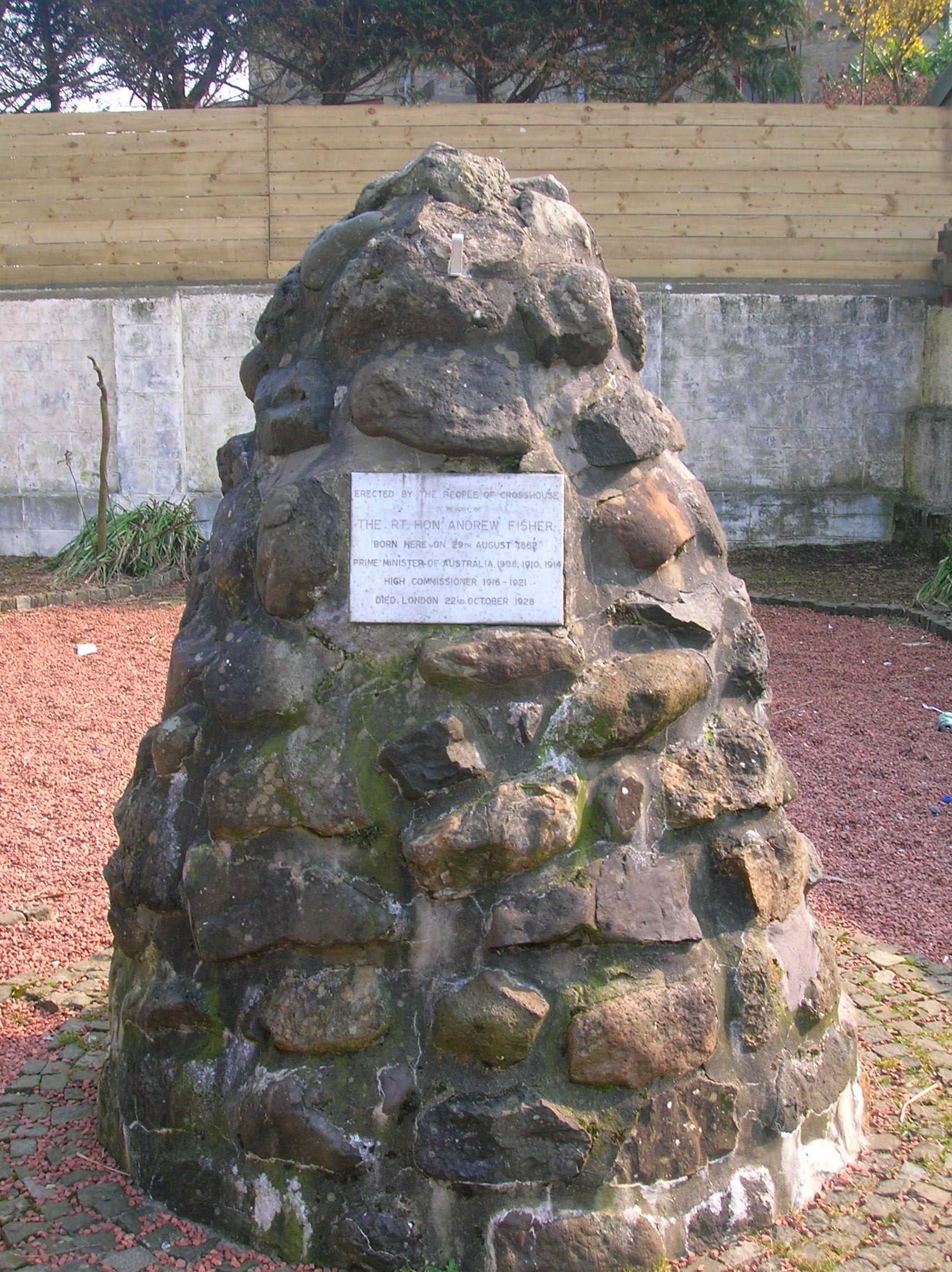
The Andrew Fisher cairn in Crosshouse.

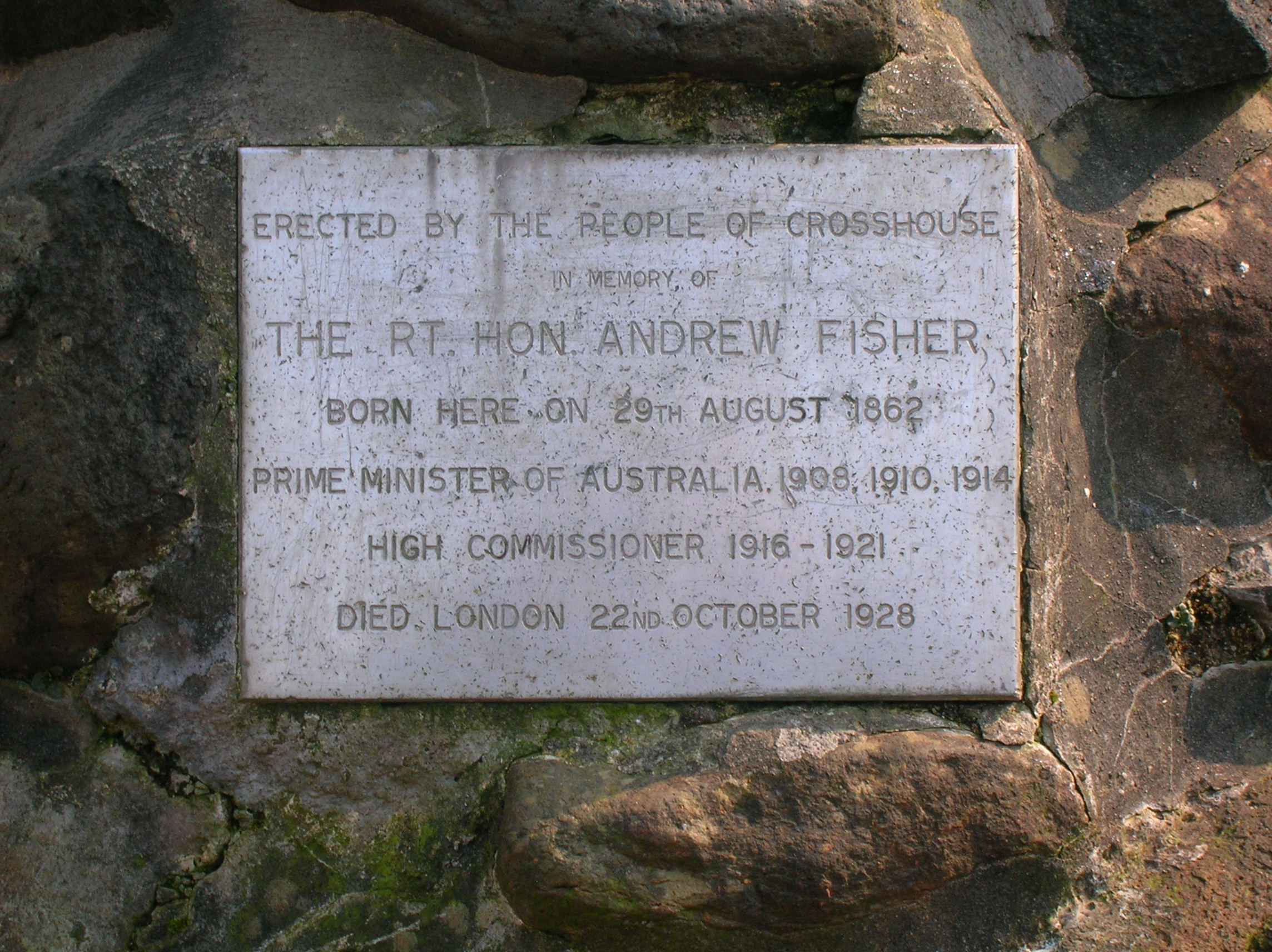
The Andrew Fisher plaque.

On the 1860 OS map the road from Kilmarnock enters via a ford with a wooden footbridge.

In 1912 J. & R. Howie of Plann have a rental income of £703 6s 0d, John Barr has £181 5s 0d and Hugh Robert Wallace of Busbie has the considerable income of £1,451 5s 0d.

The 'Tiber Tavern' was opened in the late 1990s, but has struggled to survive and having closed once it has re-opened. The last local shop ceased trading in the 1990s.

The 1860 OS map marks a fine dwelling named as 'Knockentiber House'. This site is still occupied by a similarly dwelling, although apparently much modified. This was presumably the abode of a local business magnate.

Above Busbiehead and Fergushill farms is a plantation on the 1860 OS called 'Lochhead'. This may be another of the many small lochs or lochans drained over the years to provide land for farming. The lochs at Halket near Lugton and at Lambroughton are other examples of drained former lochs.

New housing estates have boosted the population considerably (2007).

In 1832 an outbreak of cholera claimed many lives in Kilmaurs and to prevent the entrance of strangers or vagrants, guards were placed at Knockentiber, Gatehead and other places to prevent any communication between the occupants of Kilmaurs and the rest of the community.

== Views of Knockentiber and Busbie ==
An 18th century print of Busbie Castle.

A photograph of Busbie Castle in 1912.

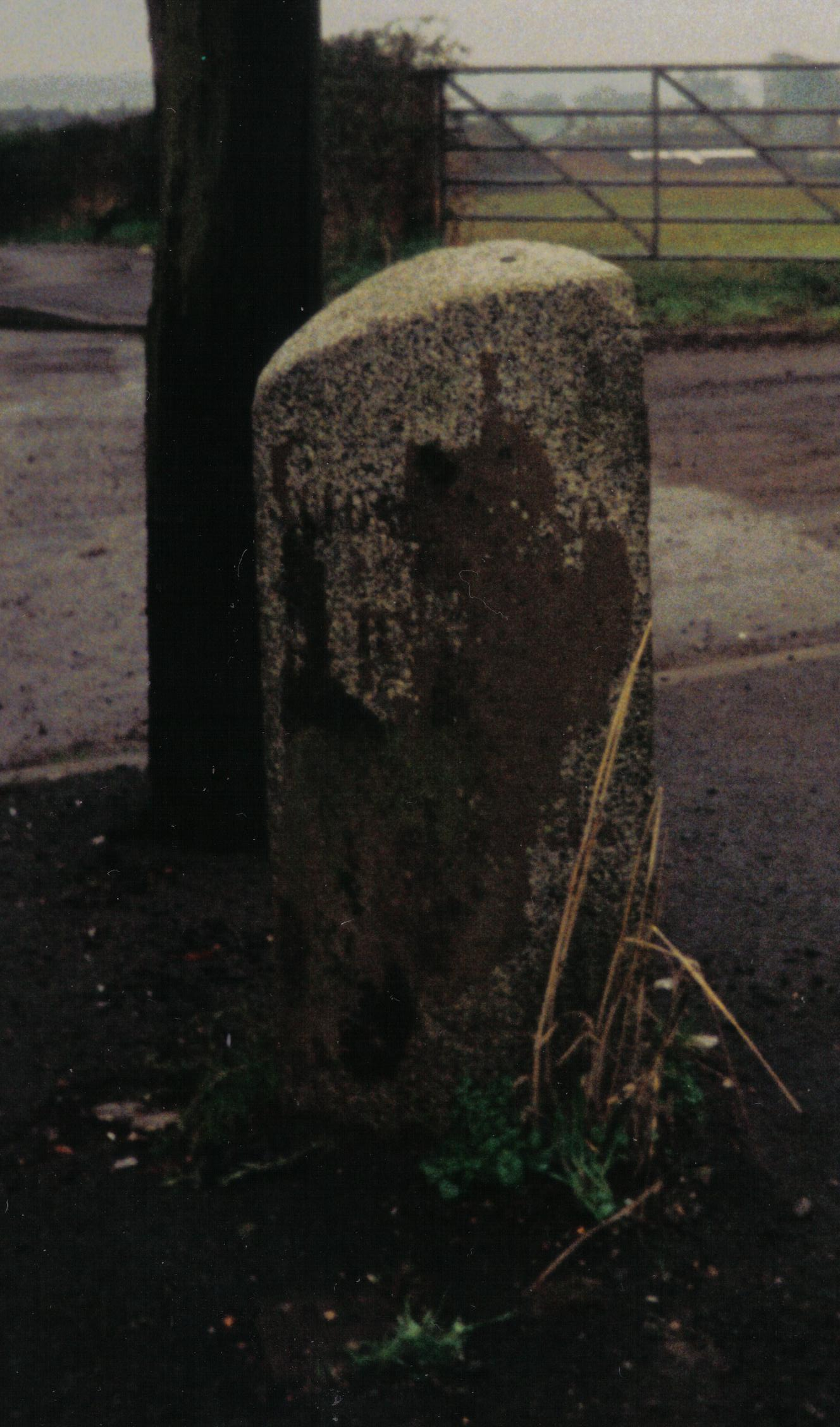
A milestone near Busbie Farm.

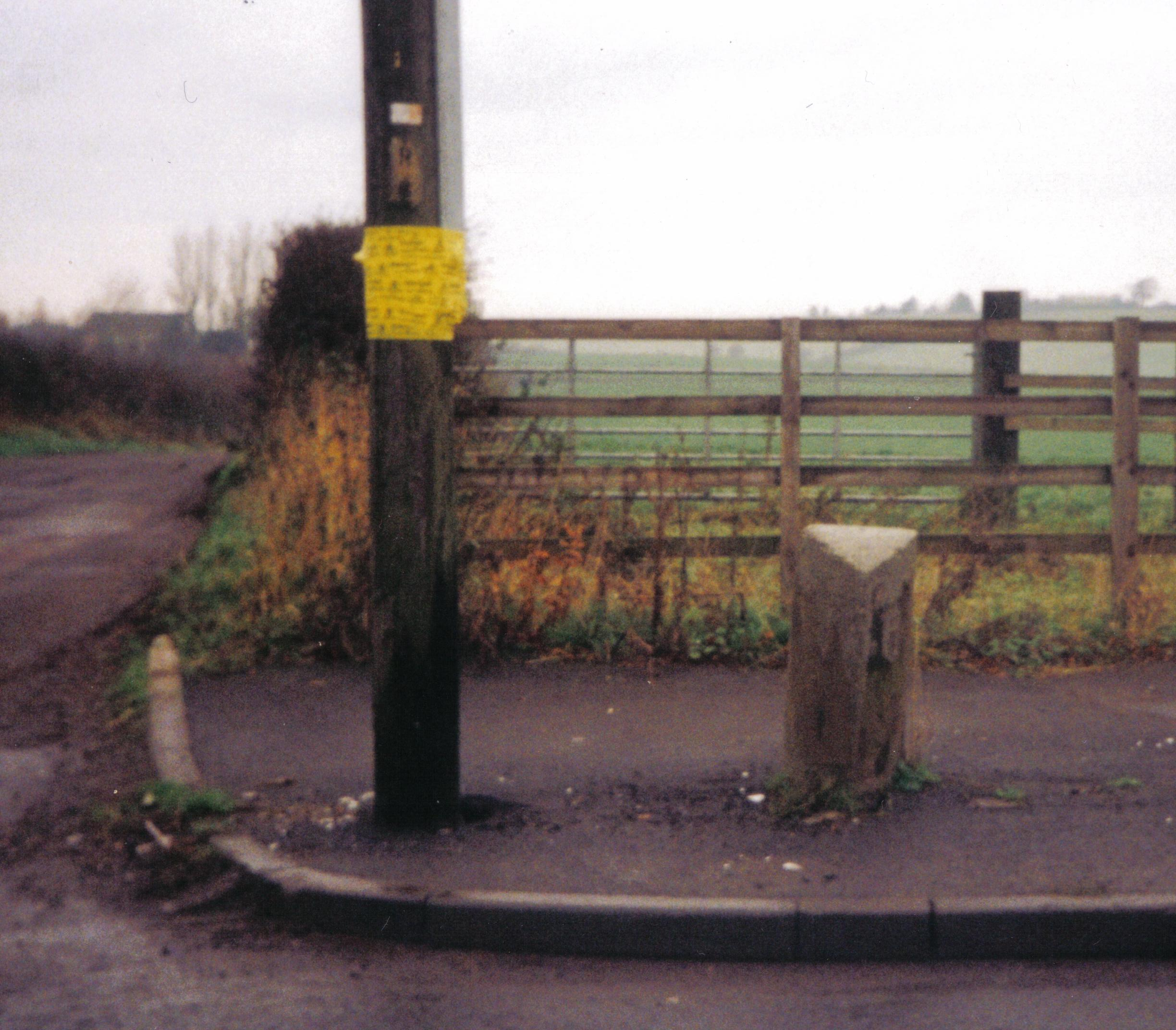
The milestone and the track up to the old Busbie Colliery and coalpits.
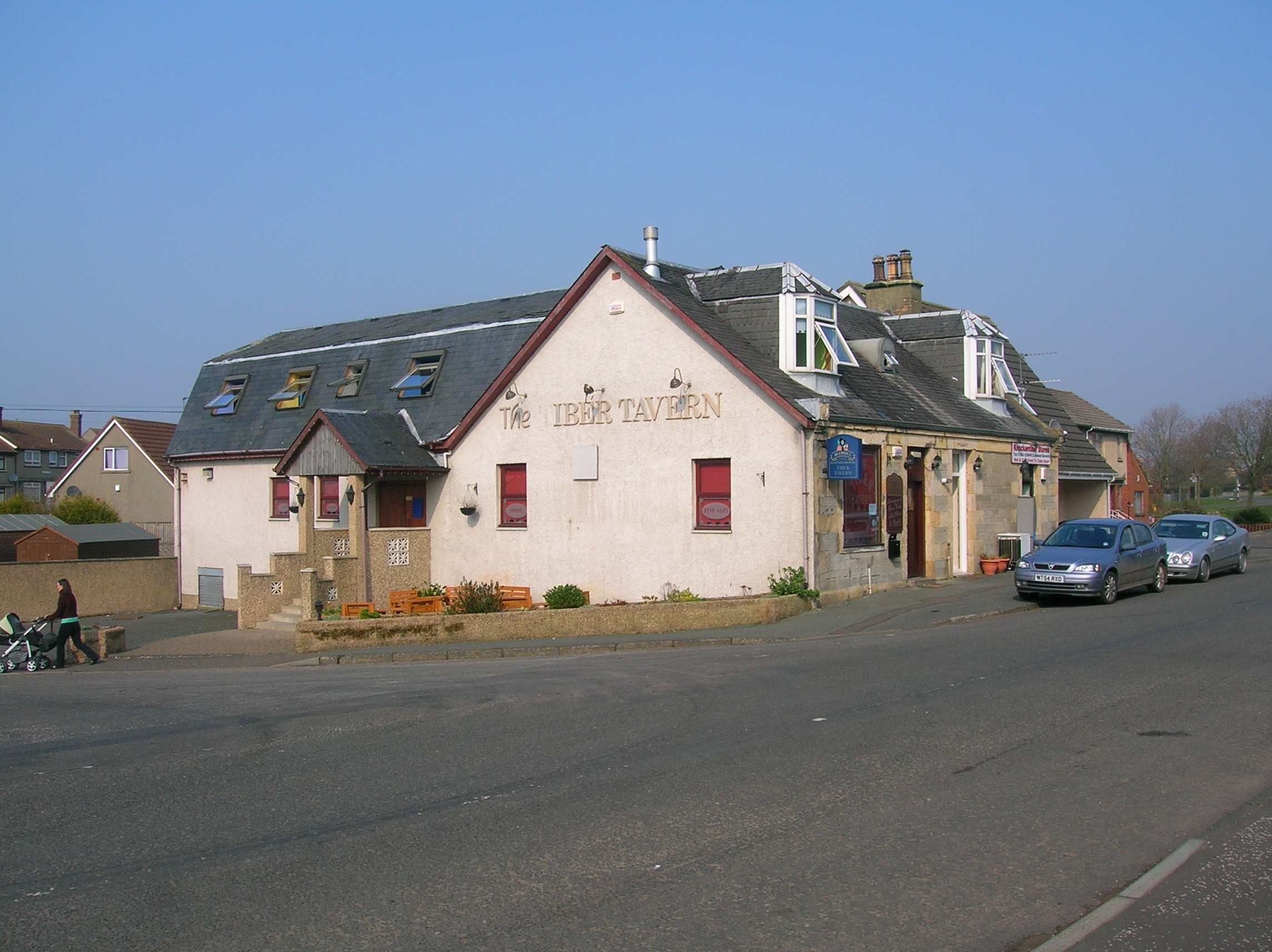
The 'Tiber Tavern' in 2007.

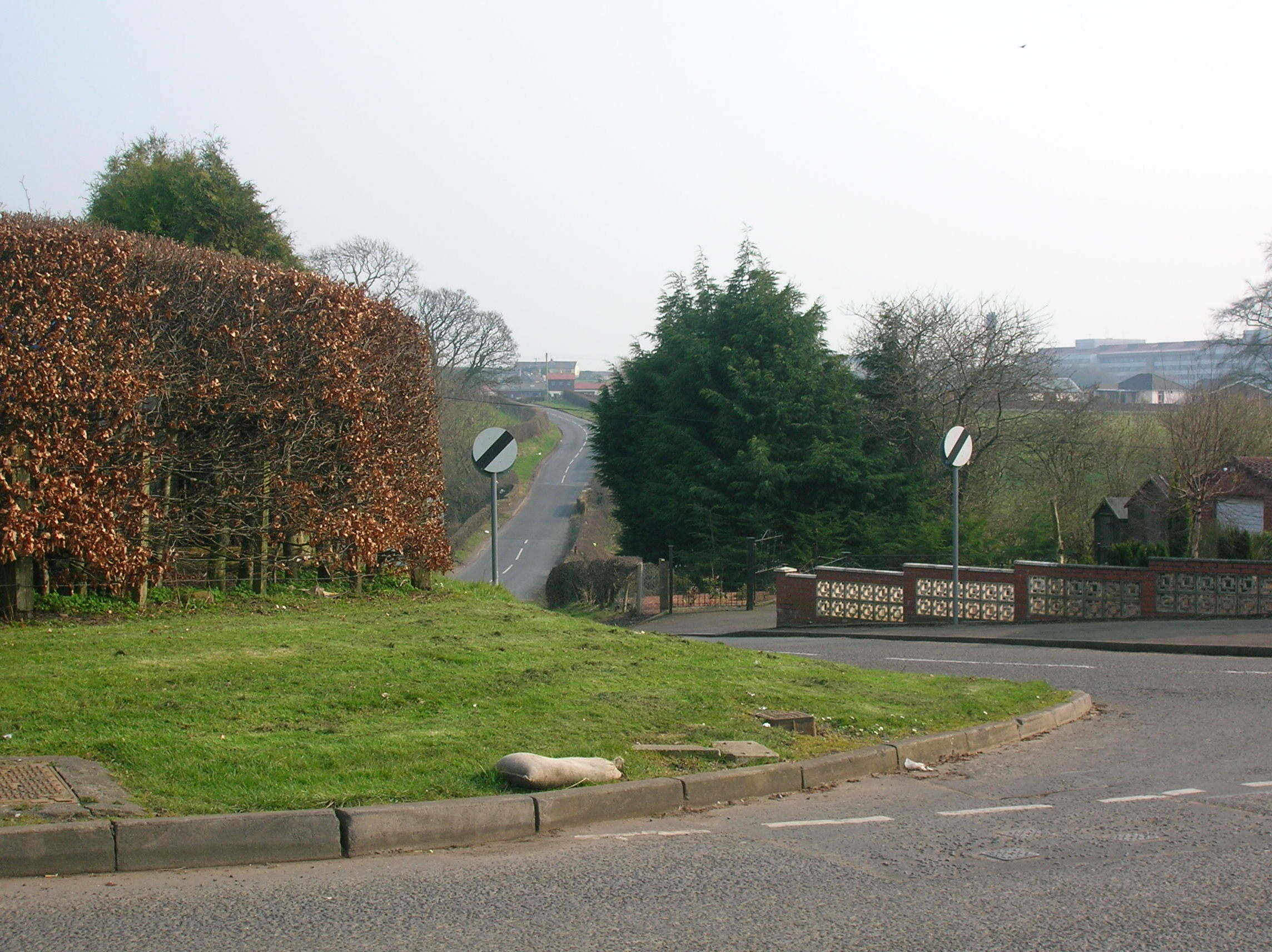
The Kilmarnock road via Fardalehill. Site of the 1860s ford. 2007.

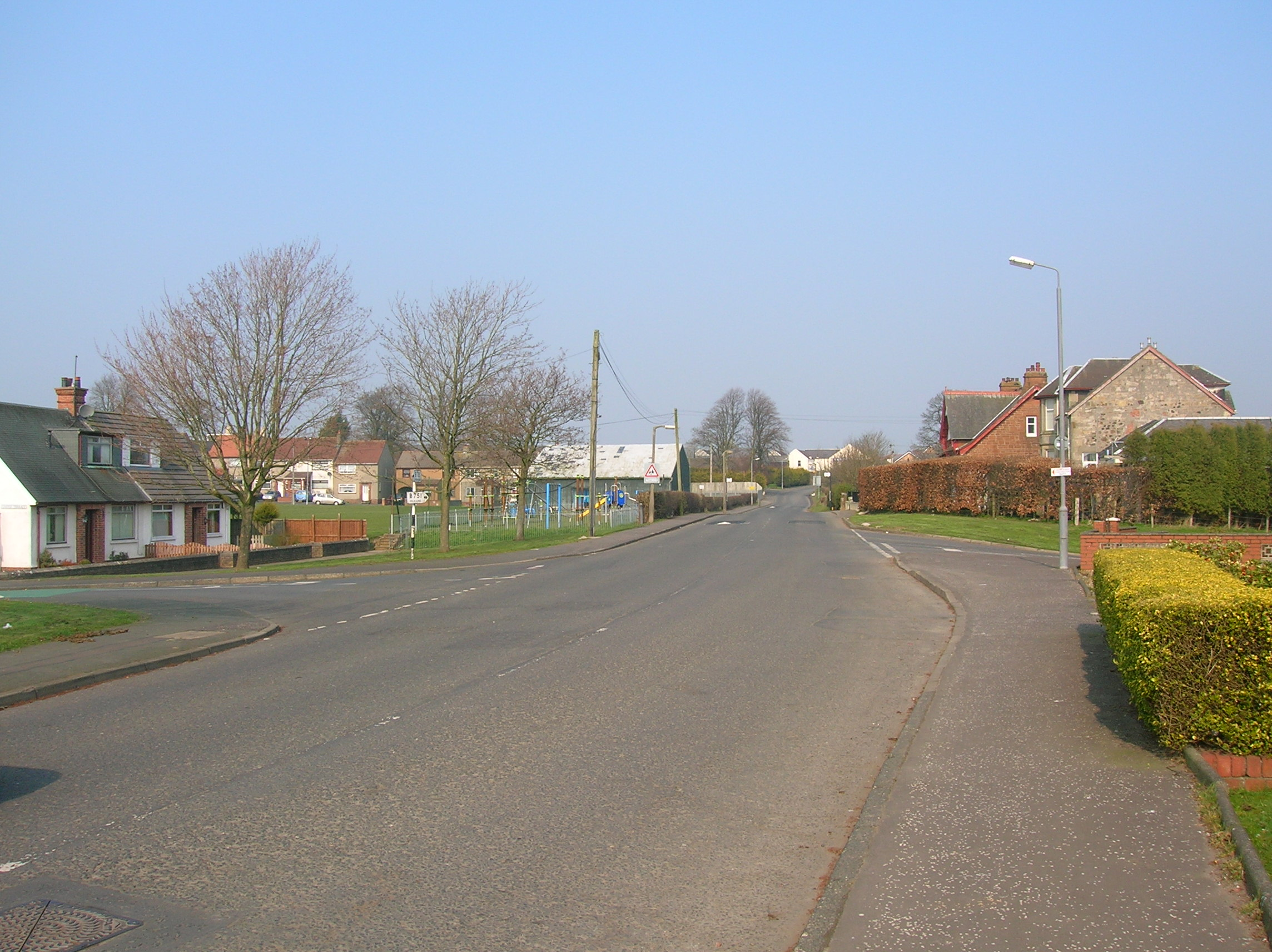
Knockentiber mainstreet, looking towards the old station. 2007.

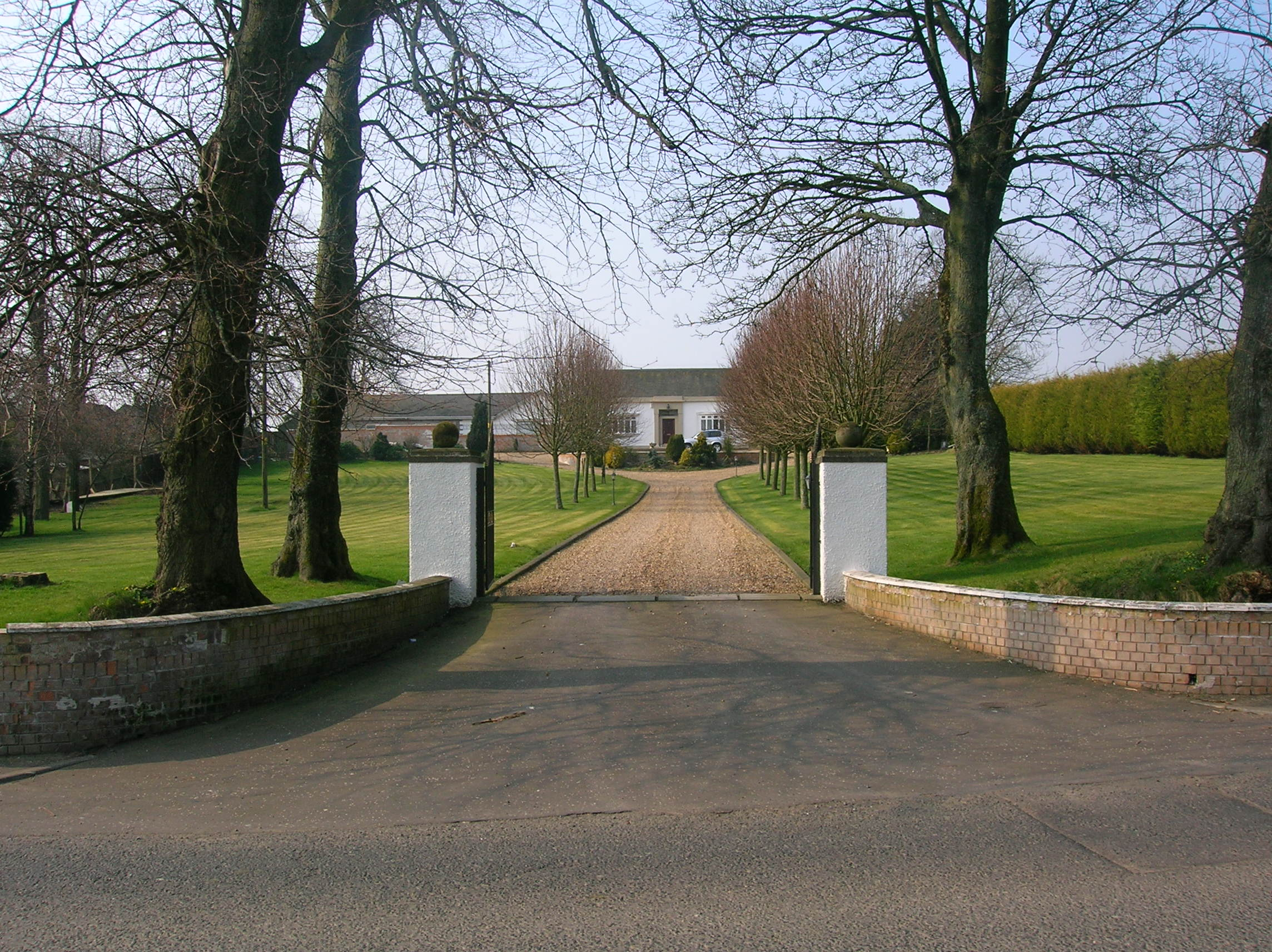
Plann house.

== See also ==
- List of places in East Ayrshire
- Bailliehill Mount
