= Clan Cunningham =

Scottish clan

Cunningham
- Crest: A silver unicorn's head with mane and horn of gold
- Motto: "Over Fork Over"
- War cry: None

Profile
- Region: Scottish Lowlands
- District: Ayrshire and Renfrewshire
- Animal: unicorn

Chief
- Sir John Christopher Foggo Montgomery Cunninghame of Kilmaurs
- Baronet of Corsehill; Chief of the name and arms of Cunninghame
- Historic seat: Finlaystone Castle
Clan branches
Earls of Glencairn (historic chiefs)
Cunninghams of Corsehill (current chiefs)
Cunninghams of Cunninghamhead
Cunninghams of Aitket
Cunninghams of Robertland
Cunninghams of Caprington
Cunningham of Drumquhassle
See also:
Cunningham baronets
Cunynghame baronets
Montgomery-Cuninghame baronets
Allied clans
Clan Graham
Clan Comyn
Rival clans
Clan Montgomery

Clan Cunningham is a Scottish clan. The traditional origins of the clan are placed in the 12th century. However, the first contemporary record of the clan chiefs is in the thirteenth century. The chiefs of the Clan Cunningham supported Robert the Bruce during the Wars of Scottish Independence. In the 15th and 16th centuries, the Clan Cunningham feuded with the Clan Montgomery. Historically, the chief of Clan Cunningham held the title of Earl of Glencairn. However, in modern times the chief of the clan is Cunningham of Corsehill. On 18 December 2013, Sir John Christopher Foggo Montgomery Cunninghame, Baronet of Corsehill, was recognized by Lord Lyon as Clan Chief after the chiefship had been vacant for over 200 years.

== History ==
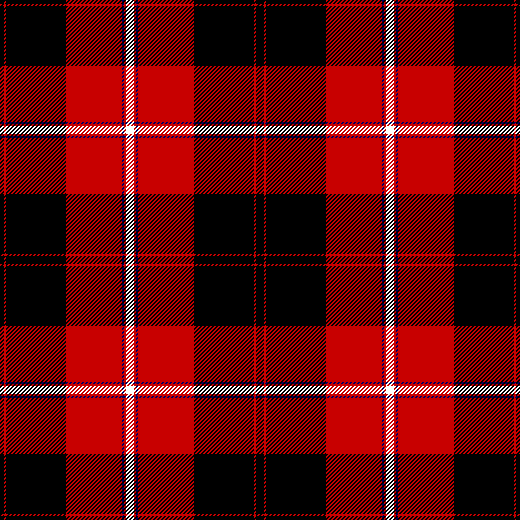
Cunningham tartan

=== Origins ===
Cunninghame is in the northern part of Ayrshire. Fredric van Bassen stated that in the year 1059, King Malcolm rewarded Malcolm, son of Friskin with the lands of Cunningham.

The progenitor of the family known as Cunningham was Warnebald, who received a grant for the land of the Manor Cunningham between 1135 and 1140. The charming legend that relates to King Malcolm says that the son of Friskin, obtained the lands from Malcolm III of Scotland after he had sheltered him under hay in a barn and this is said to have given rise to the family's coat of arms which is of a shake-fork, as well as the motto Over fork over. Sir George Mackenzie states that the coat of arms allude to the office of Master of the King's Stables and other explanations exist.

The Cunninghams were certainly well settled in their lands and the parish of Kilmaurs by the end of the thirteenth century. The son of the Laird of Kilmaurs was Hervy de Cunningham who fought for Alexander III of Scotland at the Battle of Largs in 1263 against the Norse invaders. The following year he received a charter from the king confirming all of his lands.

=== Wars of Scottish Independence ===
During the Wars of Scottish Independence the Cunninghams were supporters of the Bruces in their fight for Scottish independence. However prior to this their name appears in the Ragman Rolls, swearing fealty to Edward I of England in 1296. Bruce being generous to his supporters and after his victory, the lands of Lamburgton were added to that of Kilmaurs in 1319 by royal charter. Sir William Cunningham of Kilmaurs was amongst the Scottish noblemen offered as a hostage to David II of Scotland's English captors in 1354. Sir William's eldest son, also named William, married Margaret, daughter of Sir Robert Denniston of that Ilk and acquired through her substantial lands including Glen Cairn and Finlayston in Renfrewshire.

=== 15th and 16th century and clan conflicts ===
Sir William Cunningham's grandson was created Lord Kilmaurs in 1462 and then later Earl of Glencairn. One of his younger brothers was the ancestor of the Cunninghams of Caprington branch of the clan who later achieved their own prominence. Other distinguished branches of the clan are the Cunninghams of Cunninghamhead, the Cunninghams of Aitket, the Cunninghams of Robertland, and the Cunninghams of Corsehill.

In 1488 the Clan Montgomery burned down the Clan Cunningham's Kerelaw Castle. This was part of a century-long feud that had apparently started when the office of Baillie in Cuninghame, held by the Cunninghams, was awarded to the son of Lord Montgomerie on 31 January 1448-9. The two clans had been on opposing sides at the Battle of Sauchieburn, with Hugh Montgomery among the victorious rebels, and Alexander Cunningham, 1st Earl of Glencairn slain with the defeated James III. A longstanding rivalry (principally over the Bailieship of Cunninghame) was now a vendetta.

During the 16th century, the long-running feud continued. Edward Cunningham of Auchenharvie was slain in 1526 and Archibald Cunningham of Waterstoun in 1528; the Montgomery's Eglinton Castle was burned down by the Cunninghams in the same year. In April 1586, Hugh Montgomery, 4th Earl of Eglinton, aged twenty-four, was traveling to Stirling to join the Court having been commanded to attend by the King, accompanied only by a few domestic servants. He stopped at Lainshaw Castle to dine with his close relative, a Montgomery, the Lord of Lainshaw, whose Lady was a Margaret Cunningham of Aiket Castle, with sisters married to John Cunningham of Corsehill and David Cunningham of Robertland. It seems that a plot to kill the Earl had been organized and the Lady or some say a servant girl who was also a Cunningham, climbed to the battlements after the meal to hang out a white table napkin and thereby sprung the trap. Thirty Cunninghames attacked the Earl as he crossed Annick Ford and cut his servants to pieces; the Earl himself was dispatched with a single shot from the pistol of John Cunningham of Clonbeith Castle. His horse carried his dead body along the side of the river, still known as the 'Weeping', 'Mourning', or 'Widows' path. A wave of bloody revenge swept over Cunninghame and elsewhere. Cunningham relatives, friends, and supporters were killed without mercy. Aiket was killed near his home; Robertland and Corsehill escaped to Denmark. Clonbeith was traced to a house in Hamilton, possibly Hamilton Palace and hacked to pieces by Robert Montgomery and John Pollock. Robert also killed the Earl of Glencairn's brother the Commendator of Kilwinning Abbey, Alexander of Montgreenan, thought to have instigated Hugh's murder. He rode to Montgreenan and shot the Commendator at his own gate. The government of King James VI of Scotland eventually managed to make the chiefs of the two clans shake hands. In 1661 Lord High Chancellor William Cunningham, 9th Earl of Glencairn, married Margaret Montgomery, daughter of Alexander, 6th Earl of Eglinton, drawing a line under the feud.

In 1513 Cuthbert Cunningham, earl of Glencairn was killed at the Battle of Flodden. The fifth Cunningham Earl of Glencairn was a Protestant reformer and a patron of John Knox. The English saw the Reformation as an opportunity to discomfort the Scottish Crown and Glencairn was accused of being in their pay. Glencairn rose up against Mary, Queen of Scots and at the Battle of Carberry Hill in 1567 where she surrendered, Glencairn was one of the commanders. He is said to have then ordered the destruction of the Chapel Royal at Holyrood. The Cunninghams were among the Scots who were undertakers of the Plantation of Ulster. Sir James Cunningham who married a daughter of the Earl of Glencairn was granted five thousand acres in County Donegal. The name Cunningham is in the top seventy-five most common in Ulster.

=== 17th century and Civil War ===
During the Scottish Civil War, William Cunningham, 9th Earl of Glencairn supported Charles II of England. In 1653 Glencairn raised a force to oppose General Monk. In August of that year Glencairn went to Lochearn in Perthshire where he met with some of the Highland clan chiefs. In 1654, with a body of fighting men, Glencairn took possession of Elgin. He then announced a commission to raise all of Scotland against Oliver Cromwell but the rising was a failure. Glencairn however escaped with his life and after the Restoration he was made Lord Chancellor of Scotland.

In 1669 Sir John Cunningham of Caprington, a lawyer, was created a Baronet of Nova Scotia by Charles II.

=== 18th century and Jacobite risings ===
At the Battle of Culloden in 1746, the British artillery which fired grapeshot at the advancing Jacobites was Captain Cunningham's Company, although its commander, Archibald Cunningham, had been dead for two months.

Alexander Cunningham was a historical writer who was the British envoy to Venice from 1715 to 1720. Charles Cunningham was famous for his historical paintings, some of which are in Hermitage Palace in Saint Petersburg and also in Berlin. William Cunningham of Robertland was a friend of the poet Robert Burns. Allan Cunningham was a poet and writer who some believe was only eclipsed by Burns himself. Alan Cunningham's work was supported by Sir Walter Scott who provided for Cunningham's children after his death.

== Castles ==
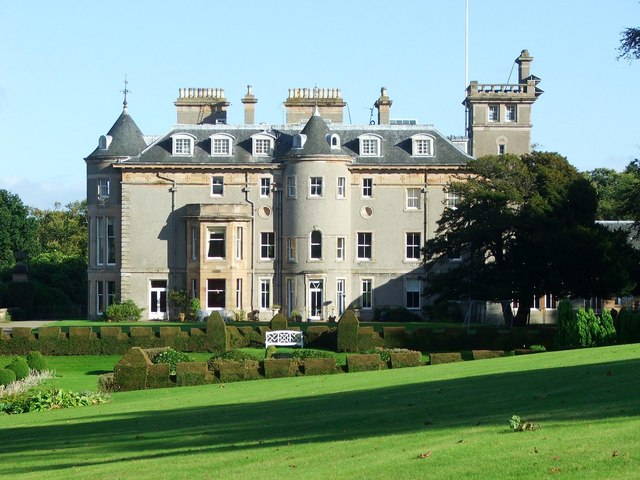
The modern Finlaystone House in Kilmacolm.

Clan Cunningham castles, castle houses, and great estates:

- Finlaystone Castle, known today as Finlaystone House, is near Port Glasgow in County Inverclyde (just across the border from County Renfrewshire), was held from 1399 to 1873 by Clan Cunningham (their Chiefs the Lords Kilmaurs from 1399 to 1488 and their Chiefs the Earls of Glencairn from 1488 to 1796 when the Earldom and Chiefship fell dormant until the 21st century.[12] In 1797 Finlaystone passed to Cunningham heirs, including Robert Cunningham Graham of Dartmore, and was finally sold in 1873 to the Kidstons, and later passed to the Clan MacMillan in 1929.
- Kilmaurs Place, about two and a half miles north of Kilmarnock in County Ayershire, dates from 1620 although the lands of Kilmaurs had been held by the Cunninghams since the thirteenth century
- Kilmaurs Castle - The Cunninghams had an earlier stronghold near Jocksthorn Farm in Kilmaurs.
- Glencairn Castle, now known as Maxwelton House, is a couple of miles east of Moniaive in Dumfries and Galloway. The building is a seventeenth-century tower house of two stories and includes a later mansion and tower house. The property was originally held by the Dennistouns but passed by marriage in the fifteenth century to the Cunninghams of Kilmaurs. The castle was named Glencairn after the Cunningham's earldom which is currently dormant. The castle was sold to the Laurie family in 1611 and they changed the name from Glencairn to Maxwelton.
- Caprington Castle is about two miles south-west of Kilmarnock, Ayrshire and has a massive keep dating from the fifteenth century that is encased in a castellated mansion. It was originally held by the Wallaces of Sundrum but passed by marriage in 1425 to the Cunninghams. These Cunninghams were afterwards styled 'of Caprington'.
- Aiket Castle was about four miles south-east of Beith, Ayrshire, and dates from the sixteenth century. It is an altered and extended tower house. The lands were held by the Cunninghams of Aiket from the fifteenth century or earlier. The property passed to the Dunlops in the eighteenth century and was later used to house farm workers, until it burned down in the 1960s.
- Robertland Castle is about one-mile north-east of Stewarton, Ayrshire. It was held by the Cunninghams in 1506 and David Cunningham of Robertland, with others, murdered Hugh Montgomery. However Cunningham was later hunted down and killed as well, although the feud between the two clans continued for at least another twenty years.
- Kerelaw Castle was built by the Cunningham Earls of Glencairn but was destroyed in a feud in 1488 and later sacked by the Clan Montgomery in 1528.
- Kyle Castle in East Ayrshire was once held by the Cunningham Clan.
- Auchenharvie Castle.
- Corsehill Castle, Stewarton.
- Lainshaw Castle, Stewarton.
- Clonbeith Castle, Auchentiber.
- Montgreenan Castle, Auchentiber.
- Glengarnock Castle.
- Lambroughton
- Lands of Doura
- Thorntoun house and estate is near Kilmarnock and was held by the Cunninghams from 1699 together with the estate of Caddel near Kilwinning.
- Towerlands - A small estate once held by the Cunningham Clan.

== See also ==
- Barony and Castle of Corsehill
- Cunningham
- Cunninghamhead
- Cunninghamhead Estate
- Cunninghamhead, Perceton and Annick Lodge
