= List of peers 1790–1799 =

This page lists all peers who held extant titles between 1790 and 1799.

== Peerage of England, Scotland and Great Britain ==
=== Dukes ===
Title	Holder	Date gained	Date lost	Notes
Peerage of England
Duke of Cornwall (1337)	George, Prince of Wales	1762	1820	
Duke of Norfolk (1483)	Charles Howard, 11th Duke of Norfolk	1786	1815	
Duke of Somerset (1547)	Edward Seymour, 9th Duke of Somerset	1757	1792	Died
Duke of Somerset (1547)	Webb Seymour, 10th Duke of Somerset	1792	1793	Died
Duke of Somerset (1547)	Edward St Maur, 11th Duke of Somerset	1793	1855	
Duke of Richmond (1675)	Charles Lennox, 3rd Duke of Richmond	1750	1806	
Duke of Grafton (1675)	Augustus FitzRoy, 3rd Duke of Grafton	1757	1811	
Duke of Beaufort (1682)	Henry Somerset, 5th Duke of Beaufort	1756	1803	
Duke of St Albans (1684)	Aubrey Beauclerk, 5th Duke of St Albans	1786	1802	
Duke of Bolton (1689)	Harry Powlett, 6th Duke of Bolton	1765	1794	Died; Dukedom extinct; Marquessate of Winchester succeeded by a cousin, see below
Duke of Leeds (1694)	Francis Osborne, 5th Duke of Leeds	1789	1799	Died
Duke of Leeds (1694)	George Osborne, 6th Duke of Leeds	1799	1838	
Duke of Bedford (1694)	Francis Russell, 5th Duke of Bedford	1771	1802	
Duke of Devonshire (1694)	William Cavendish, 5th Duke of Devonshire	1764	1811	
Duke of Marlborough (1702)	George Spencer, 4th Duke of Marlborough	1758	1817	
Duke of Rutland (1703)	John Manners, 5th Duke of Rutland	1787	1857	
Peerage of Scotland
Duke of Hamilton (1643)	Douglas Hamilton, 8th Duke of Hamilton	1769	1799	Died
Duke of Hamilton (1643)	Archibald Hamilton, 9th Duke of Hamilton	1799	1819	
Duke of Buccleuch (1663)	Henry Scott, 3rd Duke of Buccleuch	1751	1812	
Duke of Queensberry (1684)	William Douglas, 4th Duke of Queensberry	1778	1810	
Duke of Gordon (1684)	Alexander Gordon, 4th Duke of Gordon	1752	1827	
Duke of Argyll (1701)	John Campbell, 5th Duke of Argyll	1770	1806	
Duke of Atholl (1703)	John Murray, 4th Duke of Atholl	1774	1830	
Duke of Montrose (1707)	William Graham, 2nd Duke of Montrose	1742	1790	Died
Duke of Montrose (1707)	James Graham, 3rd Duke of Montrose	1790	1836	
Duke of Roxburghe (1707)	John Ker, 3rd Duke of Roxburghe	1755	1804	
Peerage of Great Britain
Duke of Ancaster and Kesteven (1715)	Brownlow Bertie, 5th Duke of Ancaster and Kesteven	1779	1809	
Duke of Portland (1716)	William Cavendish-Bentinck, 3rd Duke of Portland	1762	1809	
Duke of Manchester (1719)	William Montagu, 5th Duke of Manchester	1788	1843	
Duke of Dorset (1720)	John Sackville, 3rd Duke of Dorset	1769	1799	Died
Duke of Dorset (1720)	George Sackville, 4th Duke of Dorset	1799	1815	
Duke of Bridgewater (1720)	Francis Egerton, 3rd Duke of Bridgewater	1748	1803	
Duke of Newcastle (1756)	Henry Pelham-Clinton, 2nd Duke of Newcastle	1768	1794	Died
Duke of Newcastle (1756)	Thomas Pelham-Clinton, 3rd Duke of Newcastle	1794	1795	Died
Duke of Newcastle (1756)	Henry Pelham-Clinton, 4th Duke of Newcastle	1795	1851	
Duke of Gloucester and Edinburgh (1764)	Prince William Henry, Duke of Gloucester and Edinburgh	1764	1805	
Duke of Northumberland (1766)	Hugh Percy, 2nd Duke of Northumberland	1786	1819	
Duke of Cumberland and Strathearn (1766)	Prince Henry, Duke of Cumberland and Strathearn	1766	1790	Died, title extinct
Duke of Montagu (1766)	George Montagu, 1st Duke of Montagu	1766	1790	Died, title extinct
Duke of York and Albany (1784)	Prince Frederick, Duke of York and Albany	1784	1827	
Duke of Clarence and St Andrews (1789)	Prince William, 1st Duke of Clarence and St Andrews	1789	1830	
Duke of Kent and Strathearn (1799)	Prince Edward, Duke of Kent and Strathearn	1799	1820	New creation
Duke of Cumberland and Teviotdale (1799)	Ernest, Duke of Cumberland and Teviotdale	1799	1851	New creation

=== Marquesses ===
Title	Holder	Date gained	Date lost	Notes
Peerage of England
Marquess of Winchester (1551)	George Paulet, 12th Marquess of Winchester	1794	1800	Title previously held by the Dukes of Bolton
Peerage of Scotland
Marquess of Tweeddale (1694)	George Hay, 7th Marquess of Tweeddale	1787	1804	
Marquess of Lothian (1701)	William Kerr, 5th Marquess of Lothian	1775	1815	
Marquess of Annandale (1701)	George Vanden-Bempde, 3rd Marquess of Annandale	1730	1792	Died, title extinct
Peerage of Great Britain
Marquess Grey (1740)	Jemima Yorke, 2nd Marchioness Grey	1740	1797	Died, title extinct
Marquess of Buckingham (1784)	George Nugent-Temple-Grenville, 1st Marquess of Buckingham	1784	1813	
Marquess of Lansdowne (1784)	William Petty Fitzmaurice, 1st Marquess of Lansdowne	1784	1805	
Marquess of Stafford (1786)	Granville Leveson-Gower, 1st Marquess of Stafford	1786	1803	
Marquess Townshend (1787)	George Townshend, 1st Marquess Townshend	1787	1807	
Marquess of Salisbury (1789)	James Cecil, 1st Marquess of Salisbury	1789	1823	
Marquess of Bath (1789)	Thomas Thynne, 1st Marquess of Bath	1789	1796	Died
Marquess of Bath (1789)	Thomas Thynne, 2nd Marquess of Bath	1796	1837	
Marquess of Abercorn (1790)	John Hamilton, 1st Marquess of Abercorn	1790	1818	New creation
Marquess Cornwallis (1792)	Charles Cornwallis, 1st Marquess Cornwallis	1792	1805	New creation
Marquess of Hertford (1793)	Francis Seymour-Conway, 1st Marquess of Hertford	1793	1794	New creation; died
Marquess of Hertford (1793)	Francis Ingram-Seymour-Conway, 2nd Marquess of Hertford	1794	1822	
Marquess of Bute (1796)	John Stuart, 1st Marquess of Bute	1796	1814	New creation

=== Earls ===
Title	Holder	Date gained	Date lost	Notes
Peerage of England
Earl of Shrewsbury (1442)	Charles Talbot, 15th Earl of Shrewsbury	1787	1827	
Earl of Derby (1485)	Edward Smith-Stanley, 12th Earl of Derby	1776	1834	
Earl of Huntingdon (1529)	Theophilus Henry Hastings, ''de jure'' 11th Earl of Huntingdon	1789	1804	
Earl of Pembroke (1551)	Henry Herbert, 10th Earl of Pembroke	1749	1794	Died
Earl of Pembroke (1551)	George Herbert, 11th Earl of Pembroke	1794	1827	
Earl of Devon (1553)	William Courtenay, de jure 9th Earl of Devon	1788	1831	
Earl of Suffolk (1603)	John Howard, 15th Earl of Suffolk	1783	1830	
Earl of Exeter (1605)	Brownlow Cecil, 9th Earl of Exeter	1754	1793	Died
Earl of Exeter (1605)	Henry Cecil, 10th Earl of Exeter	1793	1804	
Earl of Northampton (1618)	Spencer Compton, 8th Earl of Northampton	1763	1796	Died
Earl of Northampton (1618)	Charles Compton, 9th Earl of Northampton	1796	1828	
Earl of Denbigh (1622)	Basil Feilding, 6th Earl of Denbigh	1755	1800	
Earl of Westmorland (1624)	John Fane, 10th Earl of Westmorland	1774	1841	
Earl of Peterborough (1628)	Charles Henry Mordaunt, 5th Earl of Peterborough	1779	1814	
Earl of Stamford (1628)	George Grey, 5th Earl of Stamford	1768	1819	
Earl of Winchilsea (1628)	George Finch, 9th Earl of Winchilsea	1769	1826	
Earl of Chesterfield (1628)	Philip Stanhope, 5th Earl of Chesterfield	1773	1815	
Earl of Thanet (1628)	Sackville Tufton, 9th Earl of Thanet	1786	1825	
Earl of Sandwich (1660)	John Montagu, 4th Earl of Sandwich	1729	1792	Died
Earl of Sandwich (1660)	John Montagu, 5th Earl of Sandwich	1792	1814	
Earl of Cardigan (1661)	James Brudenell, 5th Earl of Cardigan	1790	1811	Title previously held by the Duke of Montagu
Earl of Essex (1661)	William Capell, 4th Earl of Essex	1743	1799	Died
Earl of Essex (1661)	George Capel-Coningsby, 5th Earl of Essex	1799	1839	
Earl of Carlisle (1661)	Frederick Howard, 5th Earl of Carlisle	1758	1825	
Earl of Shaftesbury (1672)	Anthony Ashley-Cooper, 5th Earl of Shaftesbury	1771	1811	
Earl of Berkeley (1679)	Frederick Augustus Berkeley, 5th Earl of Berkeley	1755	1810	
Earl of Abingdon (1682)	Willoughby Bertie, 4th Earl of Abingdon	1760	1799	Died
Earl of Abingdon (1682)	Montagu Bertie, 5th Earl of Abingdon	1799	1854	
Earl of Gainsborough (1682)	Henry Noel, 6th Earl of Gainsborough	1759	1799	Died, title extinct
Earl of Plymouth (1682)	Other Windsor, 5th Earl of Plymouth	1771	1799	Died
Earl of Plymouth (1682)	Other Windsor, 6th Earl of Plymouth	1799	1833	
Earl of Scarbrough (1690)	George Lumley-Saunderson, 5th Earl of Scarbrough	1782	1807	
Earl of Rochford (1695)	William Nassau de Zuylestein, 5th Earl of Rochford	1781	1830	
Earl of Albemarle (1697)	William Keppel, 4th Earl of Albemarle	1772	1849	
Earl of Coventry (1697)	George Coventry, 6th Earl of Coventry	1751	1809	
Earl of Jersey (1697)	George Villiers, 4th Earl of Jersey	1769	1805	
Earl Poulett (1706)	John Poulett, 4th Earl Poulett	1788	1819	
Earl of Cholmondeley (1706)	George James Cholmondeley, 4th Earl of Cholmondeley	1770	1827	
Peerage of Scotland
Earl of Crawford (1398)	George Lindsay-Crawford, 22nd Earl of Crawford	1781	1808	
Earl of Erroll (1452)	George Hay, 16th Earl of Erroll	1778	1798	Died
Earl of Erroll (1452)	William Hay, 17th Earl of Erroll	1798	1819	
Earl of Sutherland (1235)	Elizabeth Gordon, 19th Countess of Sutherland	1766	1839	
Earl of Rothes (1458)	Jane Elizabeth Leslie, 12th Countess of Rothes	1773	1810	
Earl of Morton (1458)	George Douglas, 16th Earl of Morton	1774	1827	
Earl of Glencairn (1488)	James Cunningham, 14th Earl of Glencairn	1775	1791	Died
Earl of Glencairn (1488)	John Cunningham, 15th Earl of Glencairn	1791	1796	Died; peerage dormant
Earl of Eglinton (1507)	Archibald Montgomerie, 11th Earl of Eglinton	1769	1796	Died
Earl of Eglinton (1507)	Hugh Montgomerie, 12th Earl of Eglinton	1796	1819	
Earl of Cassilis (1509)	David Kennedy, 10th Earl of Cassilis	1775	1792	Died
Earl of Cassilis (1509)	Archibald Kennedy, 11th Earl of Cassilis	1792	1794	Died
Earl of Cassilis (1509)	Archibald Kennedy, 12th Earl of Cassilis	1792	1846	
Earl of Caithness (1455)	James Sinclair, 12th Earl of Caithness	1789	1823	
Earl of Buchan (1469)	David Erskine, 11th Earl of Buchan	1767	1829	
Earl of Moray (1562)	Francis Stuart, 9th Earl of Moray	1767	1810	
Earl of Home (1605)	Alexander Home, 10th Earl of Home	1786	1841	
Earl of Abercorn (1606)	John Hamilton, 9th Earl of Abercorn	1789	1818	Created Marquess of Abercorn, see above
Earl of Strathmore and Kinghorne (1606)	John Bowes, 10th Earl of Strathmore and Kinghorne	1776	1820	
Earl of Kellie (1619)	Archibald Erskine, 7th Earl of Kellie	1781	1795	Died
Earl of Kellie (1619)	Charles Erskine, 8th Earl of Kellie	1795	1797	Died
Earl of Kellie (1619)	Thomas Erskine, 9th Earl of Kellie	1797	1828	
Earl of Haddington (1619)	Thomas Hamilton, 7th Earl of Haddington	1735	1794	Died
Earl of Haddington (1619)	Charles Hamilton, 8th Earl of Haddington	1794	1828	
Earl of Galloway (1623)	John Stewart, 7th Earl of Galloway	1773	1806	
Earl of Lauderdale (1624)	James Maitland, 8th Earl of Lauderdale	1789	1839	
Earl of Loudoun (1633)	Flora Campbell, 6th Countess of Loudoun	1786	1840	
Earl of Kinnoull (1633)	Robert Hay-Drummond, 10th Earl of Kinnoull	1787	1804	
Earl of Dumfries (1633)	Patrick McDouall-Crichton, 6th Earl of Dumfries	1769	1803	
Earl of Elgin (1633)	Thomas Bruce, 7th Earl of Elgin	1771	1841	
Earl of Traquair (1633)	Charles Stewart, 7th Earl of Traquair	1779	1827	
Earl of Dalhousie (1633)	George Ramsay, 9th Earl of Dalhousie	1787	1838	
Earl of Findlater (1638)	James Ogilvy, 7th Earl of Findlater	1770	1811	
Earl of Leven (1641)	David Leslie, 6th Earl of Leven	1754	1802	
Earl of Dysart (1643)	Lionel Tollemache, 5th Earl of Dysart	1770	1799	Died
Earl of Dysart (1643)	Wilbraham Tollemache, 6th Earl of Dysart	1799	1821	
Earl of Selkirk (1646)	Dunbar Douglas, 4th Earl of Selkirk	1744	1799	Died
Earl of Selkirk (1646)	Thomas Douglas, 5th Earl of Selkirk	1799	1820	
Earl of Northesk (1647)	George Carnegie, 6th Earl of Northesk	1741	1792	Died
Earl of Northesk (1647)	William Carnegie, 7th Earl of Northesk	1792	1831	
Earl of Balcarres (1651)	Alexander Lindsay, 6th Earl of Balcarres	1768	1825	
Earl of Aboyne (1660)	Charles Gordon, 4th Earl of Aboyne	1732	1794	
Earl of Aboyne (1660)	George Gordon, 5th Earl of Aboyne	1794	1853	
Earl of Newburgh (1660)	Anthony Radclyffe, 5th Earl of Newburgh	1786	1814	
Earl of Dundonald (1669)	Archibald Cochrane, 9th Earl of Dundonald	1778	1831	
Earl of Kintore (1677)	Anthony Keith-Falconer, 5th Earl of Kintore	1778	1804	
Earl of Breadalbane and Holland (1677)	John Campbell, 4th Earl of Breadalbane and Holland	1782	1834	
Earl of Aberdeen (1682)	George Gordon, 3rd Earl of Aberdeen	1746	1801	
Earl of Dunmore (1686)	John Murray, 4th Earl of Dunmore	1752	1809	
Earl of Orkney (1696)	Mary O'Brien, 3rd Countess of Orkney	1756	1790	Died
Earl of Orkney (1696)	Mary FitzMaurice, 4th Countess of Orkney	1790	1831	
Earl of Marchmont (1697)	Hugh Hume-Campbell, 3rd Earl of Marchmont	1740	1794	Died; Peerage dormant
Earl of Hyndford (1701)	Thomas Carmichael, 5th Earl of Hyndford	1787	1811	
Earl of Stair (1703)	John Dalrymple, 6th Earl of Stair	1789	1821	
Earl of Rosebery (1703)	Neil Primrose, 3rd Earl of Rosebery	1765	1814	
Earl of Glasgow (1703)	George Boyle, 4th Earl of Glasgow	1775	1843	
Earl of Portmore (1703)	William Colyear, 3rd Earl of Portmore	1785	1823	
Earl of Bute (1703)	John Stuart, 3rd Earl of Bute	1723	1792	Died
Earl of Bute (1703)	John Stuart, 4th Earl of Bute	1792	1814	Created Marquess of Bute, see above
Earl of Hopetoun (1703)	James Hope-Johnstone, 3rd Earl of Hopetoun	1781	1816	
Earl of Deloraine (1706)	Henry Scott, 4th Earl of Deloraine	1740	1807	
Peerage of Great Britain
Earl of Oxford and Mortimer (1711)	Edward Harley, 4th Earl of Oxford and Earl Mortimer	1755	1790	Died
Earl of Oxford and Mortimer (1711)	Edward Harley, 5th Earl of Oxford and Earl Mortimer	1790	1848	
Earl of Strafford (1711)	William Wentworth, 2nd Earl of Strafford	1739	1791	Died
Earl of Strafford (1711)	Frederick Wentworth, 3rd Earl of Strafford	1791	1799	Died; Peerage extinct
Earl Ferrers (1711)	Robert Shirley, 7th Earl Ferrers	1787	1827	
Earl of Dartmouth (1711)	William Legge, 2nd Earl of Dartmouth	1750	1801	
Earl of Tankerville (1714)	Charles Bennet, 4th Earl of Tankerville	1767	1822	
Earl of Aylesford (1714)	Heneage Finch, 4th Earl of Aylesford	1777	1812	
Earl of Bristol (1714)	Frederick Hervey, 4th Earl of Bristol	1779	1803	
Earl of Sussex (1717)	Henry Yelverton, 3rd Earl of Sussex	1758	1799	Died, title extinct
Earl Cowper (1718)	George Clavering-Cowper, 4th Earl Cowper	1789	1799	Died
Earl Cowper (1718)	Peter Clavering-Cowper, 5th Earl Cowper	1799	1837	
Earl Stanhope (1718)	Charles Stanhope, 3rd Earl Stanhope	1786	1816	
Earl of Harborough (1719)	Robert Sherard, 4th Earl of Harborough	1770	1799	Died
Earl of Harborough (1719)	Philip Sherard, 5th Earl of Harborough	1799	1807	
Earl of Macclesfield (1721)	Thomas Parker, 3rd Earl of Macclesfield	1764	1795	Died
Earl of Macclesfield (1721)	George Parker, 4th Earl of Macclesfield	1795	1842	
Earl of Pomfret (1721)	George Fermor, 3rd Earl of Pomfret	1785	1830	
Earl Waldegrave (1729)	George Waldegrave, 5th Earl Waldegrave	1789	1794	Died
Earl Waldegrave (1729)	John Waldegrave, 6th Earl Waldegrave	1794	1835	
Earl of Ashburnham (1730)	John Ashburnham, 2nd Earl of Ashburnham	1737	1812	
Earl of Effingham (1731)	Thomas Howard, 3rd Earl of Effingham	1763	1791	Died
Earl of Effingham (1731)	Richard Howard, 4th Earl of Effingham	1791	1816	
Earl of Orford (1742)	George Walpole, 3rd Earl of Orford	1751	1791	Died
Earl of Orford (1742)	Horace Walpole, 4th Earl of Orford	1791	1797	Died; Peerage extinct
Earl of Harrington (1742)	Charles Stanhope, 3rd Earl of Harrington	1779	1829	
Earl of Portsmouth (1743)	John Wallop, 2nd Earl of Portsmouth	1762	1797	Died
Earl of Portsmouth (1743)	John Wallop, 3rd Earl of Portsmouth	1797	1853	
Earl Brooke (1746)	George Greville, 2nd Earl Brooke	1773	1816	
Earl of Buckinghamshire (1746)	John Hobart, 2nd Earl of Buckinghamshire	1756	1793	Died
Earl of Buckinghamshire (1746)	George Hobart, 3rd Earl of Buckinghamshire	1793	1804	
Earl Fitzwilliam (1746)	William Fitzwilliam, 2nd Earl Fitzwilliam	1756	1833	
Earl of Powis (1748)	George Herbert, 2nd Earl of Powis	1772	1801	
Earl of Egremont (1748)	George Wyndham, 3rd Earl of Egremont	1763	1837	
Earl Harcourt (1749)	George Harcourt, 2nd Earl Harcourt	1777	1809	
Earl of Hertford (1750)	Francis Seymour-Conway, 1st Earl of Hertford	1750	1794	Created Marquess of Hertford, see above
Earl of Guilford (1752)	Francis North, 1st Earl of Guilford	1752	1790	Died
Earl of Guilford (1752)	Frederick North, 2nd Earl of Guilford	1790	1792	Died
Earl of Guilford (1752)	George North, 3rd Earl of Guilford	1790	1802	
Earl Cornwallis (1753)	Charles Cornwallis, 2nd Earl Cornwallis	1762	1805	Created Marquess Cornwallis, see above
Earl of Hardwicke (1754)	Philip Yorke, 2nd Earl of Hardwicke	1764	1790	Died
Earl of Hardwicke (1754)	Philip Yorke, 3rd Earl of Hardwicke	1790	1834	
Earl of Darlington (1754)	Henry Vane, 2nd Earl of Darlington	1758	1792	Died
Earl of Darlington (1754)	William Henry Vane, 3rd Earl of Darlington	1792	1842	
Earl Fauconberg (1756)	Henry Belasyse, 2nd Earl Fauconberg	1774	1802	
Earl of Ilchester (1756)	Henry Fox-Strangways, 2nd Earl of Ilchester	1776	1802	
Earl De La Warr (1761)	John West, 4th Earl De La Warr	1783	1795	Died
Earl De La Warr (1761)	George Sackville-West, 5th Earl De La Warr	1795	1869	
Earl of Radnor (1765)	Jacob Pleydell-Bouverie, 2nd Earl of Radnor	1776	1828	
Earl Spencer (1765)	George Spencer, 2nd Earl Spencer	1783	1834	
Earl of Chatham (1766)	John Pitt, 2nd Earl of Chatham	1778	1835	
Earl Bathurst (1772)	Henry Bathurst, 2nd Earl Bathurst	1775	1794	Died
Earl Bathurst (1772)	Henry Bathurst, 3rd Earl Bathurst	1794	1834	
Earl of Ailesbury (1776)	Thomas Brudenell-Bruce, 1st Earl of Ailesbury	1776	1814	
Earl of Clarendon (1776)	Thomas Villiers, 2nd Earl of Clarendon	1786	1824	
Earl of Mansfield (1776)	William Murray, 1st Earl of Mansfield	1776	1793	Died
Earl of Mansfield (1776)	Louisa Murray, 2nd Countess of Mansfield	1793	1843	
Earl of Abergavenny (1784)	Henry Nevill, 2nd Earl of Abergavenny	1785	1843	
Earl of Leicester (1784)	George Townshend, 1st Earl of Leicester	1784	1811	
Earl of Lonsdale (1784)	James Lowther, 1st Earl of Lonsdale	1784	1802	
Earl of Uxbridge (1784)	Henry Paget, 1st Earl of Uxbridge	1784	1812	
Earl Talbot (1784)	John Chetwynd-Talbot, 1st Earl Talbot	1784	1793	Died
Earl Talbot (1784)	Charles Chetwynd-Talbot, 2nd Earl Talbot	1793	1849	
Earl Grosvenor (1784)	Richard Grosvenor, 1st Earl Grosvenor	1784	1802	
Earl Beaulieu (1784)	Edward Hussey-Montagu, 1st Earl Beaulieu	1784	1802	
Earl Camden (1786)	Charles Pratt, 1st Earl Camden	1786	1794	Died
Earl Camden (1786)	John Pratt, 2nd Earl Camden	1794	1840	
Earl Howe (1788)	Richard Howe, 1st Earl Howe	1788	1799	Died; Peerage extinct
Earl of Mount Edgcumbe (1789)	George Edgcumbe, 1st Earl of Mount Edgcumbe	1789	1795	Died
Earl of Mount Edgcumbe (1789)	Richard Edgcumbe, 2nd Earl of Mount Edgcumbe	1795	1839	
Earl Fortescue (1789)	Hugh Fortescue, 1st Earl Fortescue	1789	1841	
Earl Digby (1790)	Henry Digby, 1st Earl Digby	1790	1793	New creation; died
Earl Digby (1790)	Edward Digby, 2nd Earl Digby	1793	1856	
Earl of Beverley (1790)	Algernon Percy, 1st Earl of Beverley	1790	1830	New creation
Earl of Dorchester (1792)	Joseph Damer, 1st Earl of Dorchester	1792	1798	New creation; died
Earl of Dorchester (1792)	George Damer, 2nd Earl of Dorchester	1798	1808	
Earl of Mansfield (1792)	William Murray, 1st Earl of Mansfield	1776	1793	New creation; died
Earl of Mansfield (1792)	David Murray, 2nd Earl of Mansfield	1793	1796	Died
Earl of Mansfield (1792)	David William Murray, 3rd Earl of Mansfield	1796	1840	
Earl of Carnarvon (1793)	Henry Herbert, 1st Earl of Carnarvon	1793	1811	New creation
Earl of Liverpool (1796)	Charles Jenkinson, 1st Earl of Liverpool	1796	1808	New creation
Earl of St Vincent (1797)	John Jervis, 1st Earl of St Vincent	1797	1823	New creation

=== Viscounts ===
Title	Holder	Date gained	Date lost	Notes
Peerage of England
Viscount Hereford (1550)	George Devereux, 13th Viscount Hereford	1783	1804	
Viscount Montagu (1554)	George Browne, 8th Viscount Montagu	1787	1793	Died
Viscount Montagu (1554)	Mark Browne, 9th Viscount Montagu	1793	1797	Died, title extinct
Peerage of Scotland
Viscount of Falkland (1620)	Henry Cary, 8th Viscount Falkland	1785	1796	Died
Viscount of Falkland (1620)	Charles Cary, 9th Viscount Falkland	1796	1809	
Viscount of Stormont (1621)	David Murray, 7th Viscount of Stormont	1748	1796	Succeeded to the Earldom of Mansfield, see above
Viscount of Arbuthnott (1641)	John Arbuthnot, 6th Viscount of Arbuthnott	1756	1791	Died
Viscount of Arbuthnott (1641)	John Arbuthnot, 7th Viscount of Arbuthnott	1791	1800	
Peerage of Great Britain
Viscount Bolingbroke (1712)	George St John, 3rd Viscount Bolingbroke	1787	1824	
Viscount Falmouth (1720)	George Boscawen, 3rd Viscount Falmouth	1782	1808	
Viscount Torrington (1721)	George Byng, 4th Viscount Torrington	1750	1812	
Viscount Leinster (1747)	William FitzGerald, 2nd Viscount Leinster	1773	1804	Duke of Leinster in the Peerage of Ireland
Viscount Courtenay (1762)	William Courtenay, 3rd Viscount Courtenay	1788	1835	
Viscount Wentworth (1762)	Thomas Noel, 2nd Viscount Wentworth	1774	1815	
Viscount Dudley and Ward (1763)	William Ward, 3rd Viscount Dudley and Ward	1788	1823	
Viscount Maynard (1766)	Charles Maynard, 2nd Viscount Maynard	1775	1824	
Viscount Sackville (1782)	Charles Sackville-Germain, 2nd Viscount Sackville	1785	1843	
Viscount Sydney (1789)	Thomas Townshend, 1st Viscount Sydney	1789	1800	
Viscount Hood (1796)	Samuel Hood, 1st Viscount Hood	1796	1816	New creation
Viscount Newark (1796)	Charles Pierrepont, 1st Viscount Newark	1796	1816	New creation
Viscount Duncan (1797)	Adam Duncan, 1st Viscount Duncan	1797	1804	New creation

=== Barons ===
Title	Holder	Date gained	Date lost	Notes
Peerage of England
Baron le Despencer (1264)	Thomas Stapleton, 12th Baron le Despencer	1788	1831	
Baron Clinton (1299)	Robert Trefusis, 17th Baron Clinton	1794	1797	Claimed the title from dormancy; died
Baron Clinton (1299)	Robert Trefusis, 18th Baron Clinton	1797	1832	
Baron de Clifford (1299)	Edward Southwell, 21st Baron de Clifford	1777	1832	
Baron Audley (1313)	George Thicknesse, 19th Baron Audley	1777	1818	
Baron Willoughby de Eresby (1313)	Priscilla Bertie, 21st Baroness Willoughby de Eresby	1780	1828	
Baron Dacre (1321)	Trevor Charles Roper, 18th Baron Dacre	1786	1794	Died
Baron Dacre (1321)	Gertrude Brand, 19th Baroness Dacre	1794	1819	
Baron Grey of Ruthyn (1325)	Henry Yelverton, 19th Baron Grey de Ruthyn	1799	1810	Title previously held by the Earls of Sussex
Baron Botreaux (1368)	Elizabeth Rawdon, 16th Baroness Botreaux	1789	1808	
Baron Stourton (1448)	Charles Stourton, 17th Baron Stourton	1781	1816	
Baron Willoughby de Broke (1491)	John Peyto-Verney, 14th Baron Willoughby de Broke	1752	1816	
Baron St John of Bletso (1559)	Henry St John, 13th Baron St John of Bletso	1767	1805	
Baron Howard de Walden (1597)	John Griffin, 4th Baron Howard de Walden	1784	1797	Died, Barony fell into abeyance
Baron Petre (1603)	Robert Petre, 9th Baron Petre	1742	1801	
Baron Saye and Sele (1603)	Gregory Eardley-Twisleton-Fiennes, 14th Baron Saye and Sele	1788	1844	
Baron Arundell of Wardour (1605)	Henry Arundell, 8th Baron Arundell of Wardour	1756	1808	
Baron Dormer (1615)	Charles Dormer, 8th Baron Dormer	1785	1804	
Baron Teynham (1616)	Henry Roper, 12th Baron Teynham	1786	1800	
Baron Craven (1627)	William Craven, 6th Baron Craven	1769	1791	Died
Baron Craven (1627)	William Craven, 7th Baron Craven	1791	1825	
Baron Strange (1628)	Charlotte Murray, 8th Baroness Strange	1764	1805	
Baron Byron (1643)	William Byron, 5th Baron Byron	1736	1798	Died
Baron Byron (1643)	George Byron, 6th Baron Byron	1798	1824	
Baron Lucas of Crudwell (1663)	Amabel Hume-Campbell, 5th Baroness Lucas	1797	1833	
Baron Clifford of Chudleigh (1672)	Hugh Clifford, 5th Baron Clifford of Chudleigh	1783	1793	Died
Baron Clifford of Chudleigh (1672)	Charles Clifford, 6th Baron Clifford of Chudleigh	1793	1831	
Peerage of Scotland
Lord Somerville (1430)	James Somerville, 14th Lord Somerville	1765	1796	Died
Lord Somerville (1430)	John Southey Somerville, 15th Lord Somerville	1796	1819	
Lord Forbes (1442)	James Forbes, 16th Lord Forbes	1761	1804	
Lord Saltoun (1445)	Alexander Fraser, 16th Lord Saltoun	1781	1793	
Lord Saltoun (1445)	Alexander Fraser, 17th Lord Saltoun	1793	1853	
Lord Gray (1445)	William John Gray, 13th Lord Gray	1782	1807	
Lord Sinclair (1449)	Charles St Clair, 13th Lord Sinclair	1782	1863	
Lord Cathcart (1460)	William Cathcart, 10th Lord Cathcart	1776	1843	
Lord Sempill (1489)	Hugh Sempill, 14th Lord Sempill	1782	1830	
Lord Elphinstone (1509)	John Elphinstone, 11th Lord Elphinstone	1781	1794	Died
Lord Elphinstone (1509)	John Elphinstone, 12th Lord Elphinstone	1794	1813	
Lord Torphichen (1564)	James Sandilands, 9th Lord Torphichen	1765	1815	
Lord Lindores (1600)	John Leslie, 8th Lord Lindores	1775	1813	
Lord Colville of Culross (1604)	John Colville, 8th Lord Colville of Culross	1770	1811	
Lord Blantyre (1606)	Robert Walter Stuart, 11th Lord Blantyre	1783	1830	
Lord Cranstoun (1609)	James Cranstoun, 8th Lord Cranstoun	1778	1796	Died
Lord Cranstoun (1609)	James Cranstoun, 9th Lord Cranstoun	1796	1818	
Lord Aston of Forfar (1627)	Walter Aston, 8th Lord Aston of Forfar	1763	1805	
Lord Fairfax of Cameron (1627)	Robert Fairfax, 7th Lord Fairfax of Cameron	1781	1793	Died
Lord Fairfax of Cameron (1627)	Bryan Fairfax, 8th Lord Fairfax of Cameron	1793	1802	
Lord Napier (1627)	Francis Napier, 8th Lord Napier	1775	1823	
Lord Reay (1628)	Hugh Mackay, 6th Lord Reay	1768	1797	Died
Lord Reay (1628)	Eric Mackay, 7th Lord Reay	1797	1847	
Lord Kirkcudbright (1633)	John Maclellan, 8th Lord Kirkcudbright	1762	1801	
Lord Forrester (1633)	Anna Maria Cockburn of Ormistoun, 9th Lady Forrester	1784	1808	
Lord Banff (1642)	William Ogilvy, 8th Lord Banff	1771	1803	
Lord Elibank (1643)	Alexander Murray, 7th Lord Elibank	1785	1820	
Lord Belhaven and Stenton (1647)	William Hamilton, 7th Lord Belhaven and Stenton	1784	1814	
Lord Rollo (1651)	John Rollo, 8th Lord Rollo	1784	1786	
Lord Ruthven of Freeland (1650)	James Ruthven, 7th Lord Ruthven of Freeland	1789	1853	
Lord Bellenden (1661)	John Ker Bellenden, 5th Lord Bellenden	1753	1796	Died
Lord Bellenden (1661)	Robert Bellenden, 6th Lord Bellenden	1796	1797	Died
Lord Bellenden (1661)	William Bellenden-Ker, 7th Lord Bellenden	1797	1805	
Lord Kinnaird (1682)	George Kinnaird, 7th Lord Kinnaird	1767	1805	
