= Cunynghame =

Cunynghame is a surname, and may refer to:

- Arthur Cunynghame (1812–1884), British Army officer and memoirist
- Sir David Cunynghame, 1st Baronet (died 1708), Scottish landowner, lawyer and politician
- James Blair-Cunynghame (1913–1990), Scottish banker
- Sir James Cunynghame, 2nd Baronet (c.1685–1747), Scottish politician
- Robert James Blair Cunynghame (1841–1903), Scottish surgeon and physiologist
- Sir William Cunynghame, 4th Baronet (1747–1828), Scottish politician
