= Kerelaw Castle =

Ruin castle in Scotland

- Stevenston, North Ayrshire, Scotland
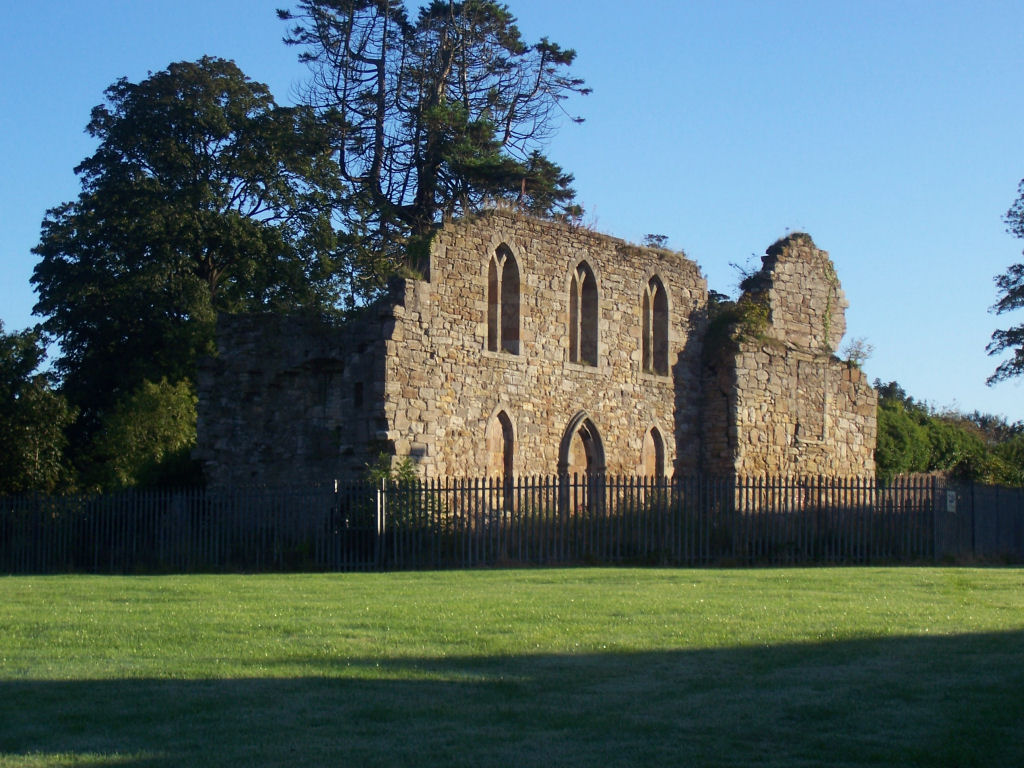
- Kerelaw Castle in 2006

Site information
- Type: Stone
- Open to the public: Yes, with limited access
- Condition: Ruined

Location
- Location within North Ayrshire
- Coordinates: 55.6484°N 4.7523°W

Site history
- Built: c. 1191, rebuilt after 1488
- Built by: Stephen Lockhart
- In use: c. 1191 to 1787

Kerelaw Castle is a castle ruin. It is situated on the coast of North Ayrshire, Scotland in the town of Stevenston.

== History ==
This castle, variously named Kerelaw, Kerila or even Turnlaw, is said by Timothy Pont to have been held by the Lockharts from Richard de Morville, Constable of Scotland, as far back as 1191, after Stephen Lockhart or Loccard obtained a grant of land in Ayrshire. This land would be named Stevenstoune (later Stevenston) after himself, and their manor-place of the barony of Stevenston, named Kerelaw. The castle and barony were eventually passed on to the Campbells of Loudoun and later to the Cunninghames (or Cunninghams/Cuninghames) of Kilmaurs. It was in the Cunninghame's possession in 1488 that the castle was sacked and burned by the 2nd Lord Montgomerie, during the well documented and long-term feud between these two prominent Ayrshire families. The Cunninghames, led by the Earl of Glencairn burned Eglinton Castle to the ground in revenge in 1528.

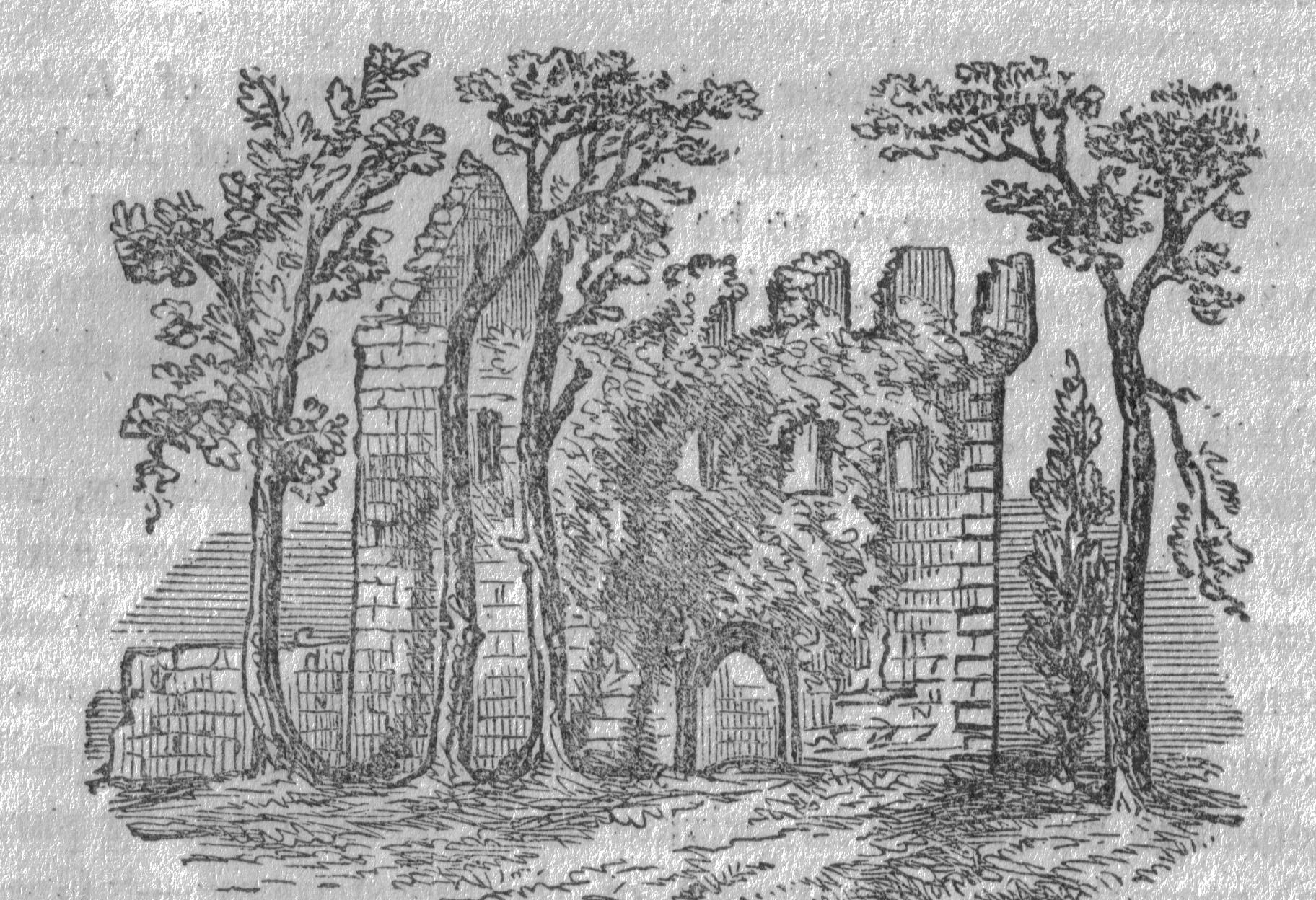
Kerila or Kerelaw Castle in the 1860s

Kerelaw was rebuilt sometime after 1488 and is reported to have contained a number of carved coats of arms of the Scottish nobility, taken from Kilwinning Abbey, Nine fishermen from Saltcoats were granted leases in 1545 in return for carrying the Earl's furniture to Finlayston on the Clyde every spring from the Creek of Saltcoats and bringing it back again in the autumn when the family returned to Kerelaw for the winter months. A half barrel of herrings was also to be furnished yearly to the Earl.

=== Abode of the Abbots ===
Local tradition is that the castle had been the residence of the Abbot of Kilwinning, which may have arisen from the fact that the third son of Alexander Cunningham, 1st Earl of Glencairn, became the Commendator of the abbey after the reformation and may have lived at Kerelaw.

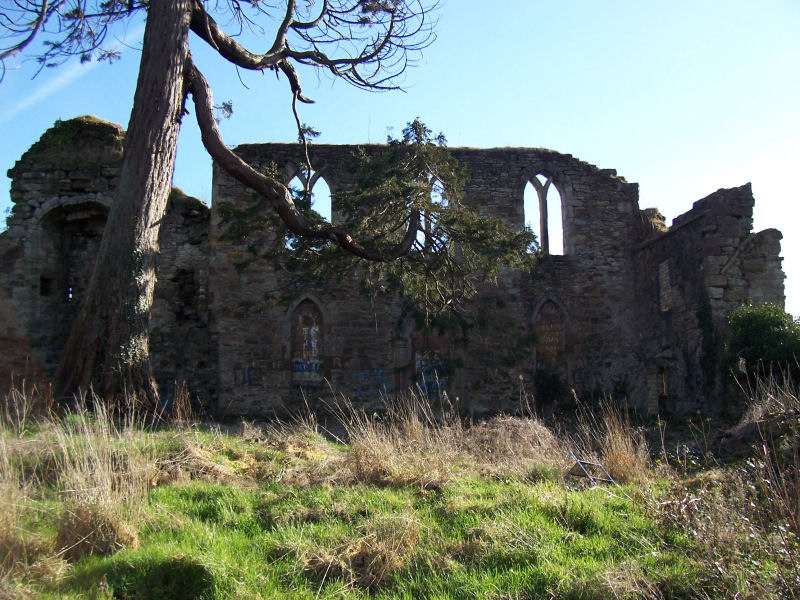
The southern castle wall in 2006

=== Later history ===
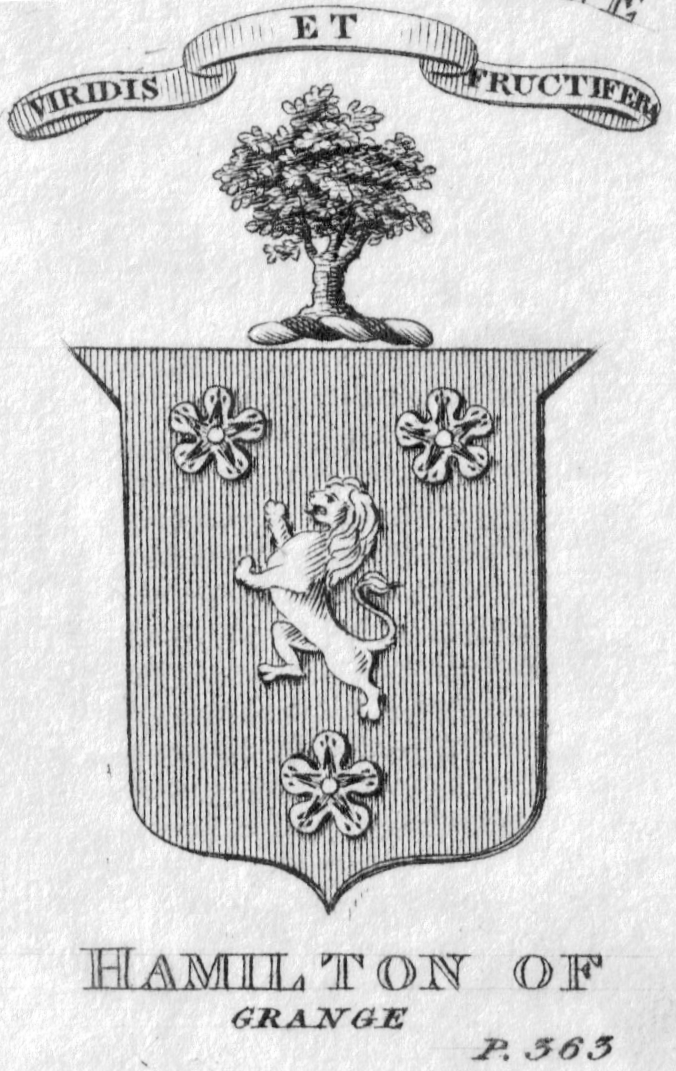
Coat of Arms of the Hamiltons of Grange

In 1609 it was bought by Sir Thomas Boyd and soon after sold again to Sir William Cunninghame of Cunninghamhead. Thirty years later the castle and the nearby lands were bought by Sir Robert Cunninghame of Auchenharvie. In 1655 Kerelaw Castle was purchased by Alexander Hamilton (the grandfather of Alexander Hamilton, a founding father of the United States of America), formerly of Cambuskeith (now known as 'The Mount'), and afterwards of Grange, who changed the name of the castle and its grounds to Grange, after the family home in Kilmarnock. Clements, Graham and McLatchie give the date of 1685 for the sale of Kerila (Kerelaw) to John Hamilton by Robert Reid Cunninghame of Seabank House (Auchenharvie) whose mining activities were causing him financial difficulties. The castle became the residence of the Hamilton family until 1787 when another Alexander Hamilton (second cousin of the American politician), built Kerelaw (or Grange) House nearby, with the castle quickly becoming disused.

The foundation stone of the new Eglinton Castle in Kilwinning was laid in 1797 by Alexander Hamilton of Grange on behalf of the 12th Earl of Eglinton.

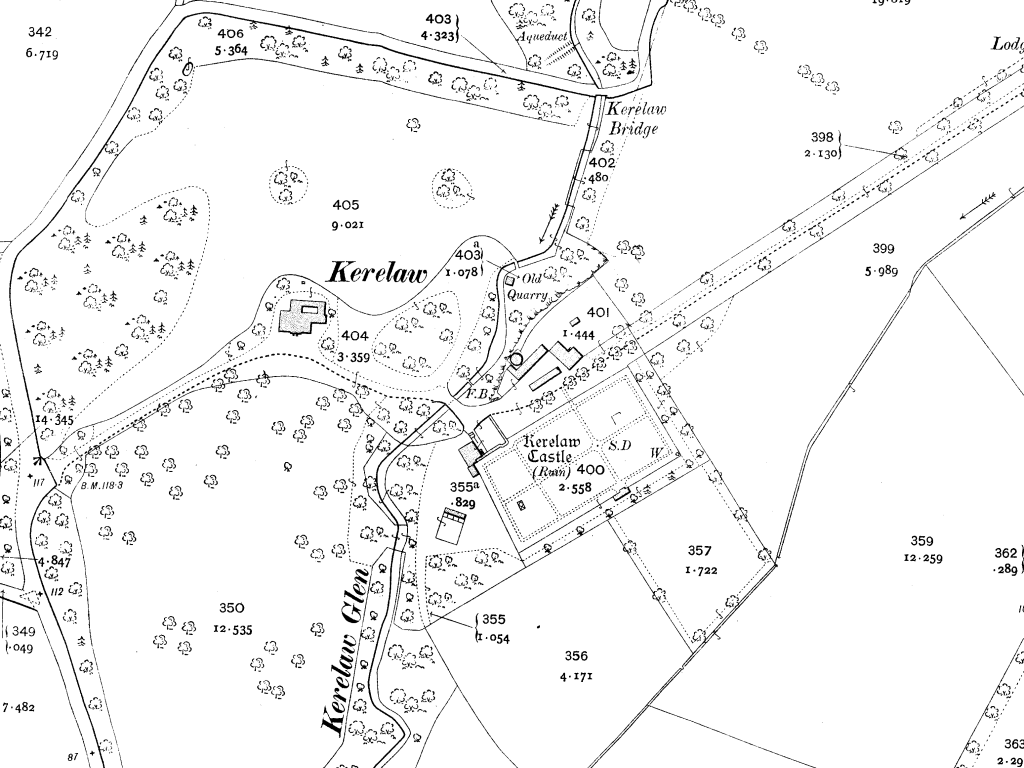
An OS map of the Kerelaw Estate from 1910

=== Ancillary buildings ===
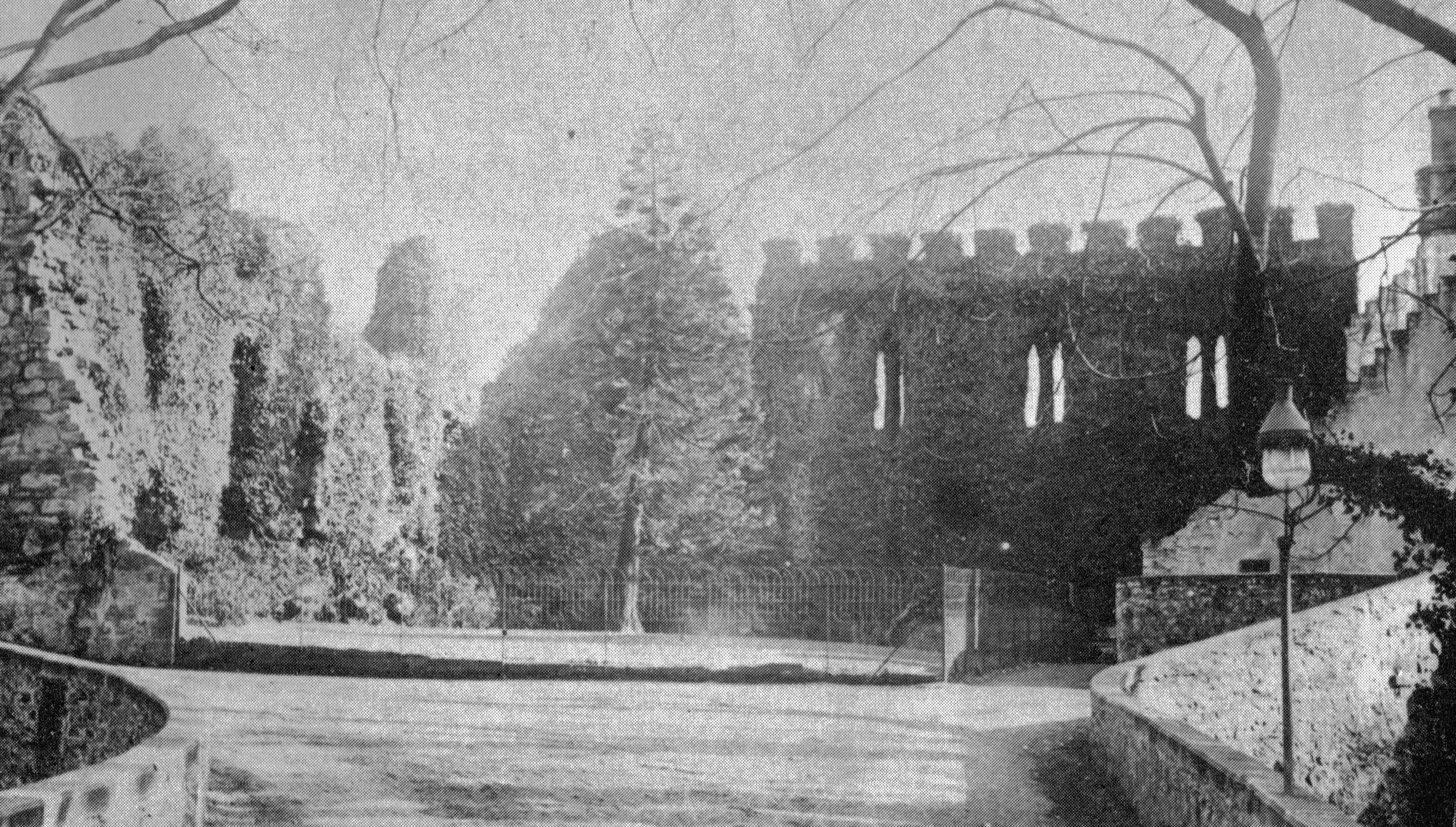
Kerelaw castle ruins in 1890 with the Laburnum tree reputed to have been sent by David Livingstone from Africa

A dovecote or doocot dated 1775 existed here (see illustration) until the 1960s when it was demolished together with other outbuildings. Cottages for the workpeople had been built in the court of the castle, and their high corbie-stepped gable-ends added to the picturesque effect of the castle ruins. The gothic windows may be one of the 19th century additions to the buildings. A limekiln was also situated nearby at NS 2706 4309. Dudups (Diddup) nearby was part of the Kerelaw/Grange Estate.

Roy's Survey map of 1747 records the name as Kerry-law, and Smith refers to it as Kerila Castle; as does Paterson. Kyryaw castle, mains and mill are marked on Ponts map of 1604–1608. A lodge house, situated to the east of the castle is marked on the older OS maps and is still in existence today (2008) as a private home.

=== Later history ===
The house, the castle and the grounds were all sold in 1838 to Gavin Fullerton after Alexander's death. Fullerton soon restored the original name of Kerelaw.

== The castle today ==
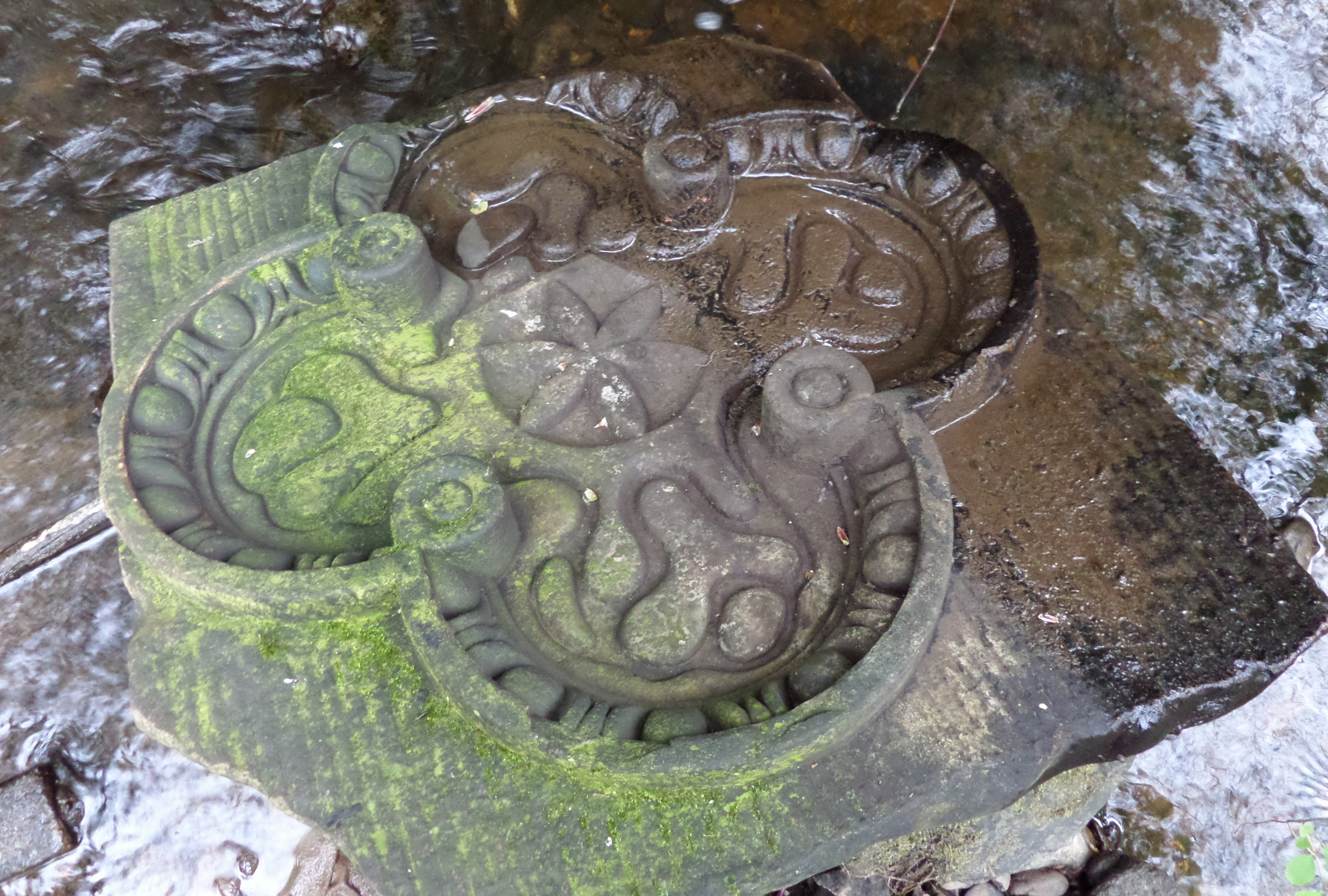
Ornate carved keystone quatrefoil from above the bridge's arch.

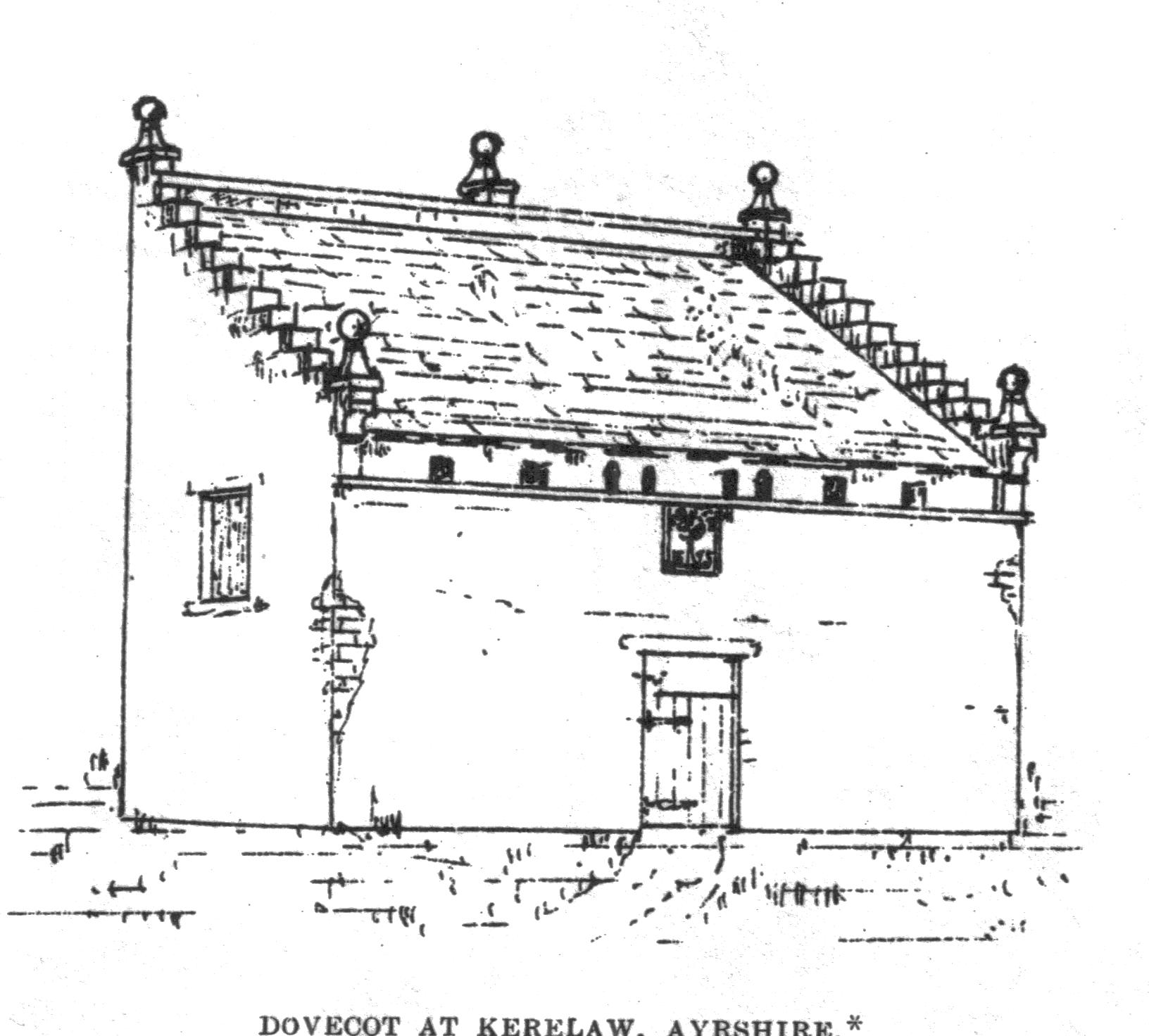
The old Kerelaw doocot of which nothing now remains

Kerelaw Castle is now a ruin, with three walls surviving in various states of decay. Gothic windows still adorn the southern wall, believed to have been inspired by those at Kilwinning Abbey (and are proof that much of the castle was built at various points in history).

In 1852 Paterson noted arrow-slits and cable mouldings of pre-14th century date. An old bridge, now used for pedestrians only, is situated next to the ruin (NS 2688 4288), but the castle itself is fenced off to protect both the public from falling stone and the castle from unwanted attention. The castle and surrounding ground is owned by North Ayrshire Council. In 2014 some repairs were carried out on the building and the immediate surroundings were cleared of excess trees and shrubs that were harming and hiding the structure. A QR Code and heritage trail plaque are attached to the fence and an interpretation board is present.

The bridge has a large cavity or 'cave' within it and this once gave access to pedestrians using the path that ran parallel to the Stevenston Burn. The arch of the bridge and the 'cave' show that the bridge was built in two stages and was widened with the upstream side being more recent. A large ornately carved cruciform embellishment has fallen from the bridge arch and lies downstream from the bridge.

The castle's former walled garden with its sundials and complex flowerbed layout is now occupied by a housing estate built in the late 1960s, but a single wall of the structure still remains. In the 1850s an orchard is shown on OS maps, located next to the walled garden.

A cobbled ford once crossed the Stevenston Burn in the Kerelaw Glen beneath the castle and ran up the bank passed the Kerelaw Mains home farm. The later limestone quarry workings destroyed the lane leading up from the ford. Two footbridges crossed the burn, one at the surviving weir and the other beyond the quarry house where mortared ashlar dressed stone walls still survive.

== Views of the castle and surroundings ==
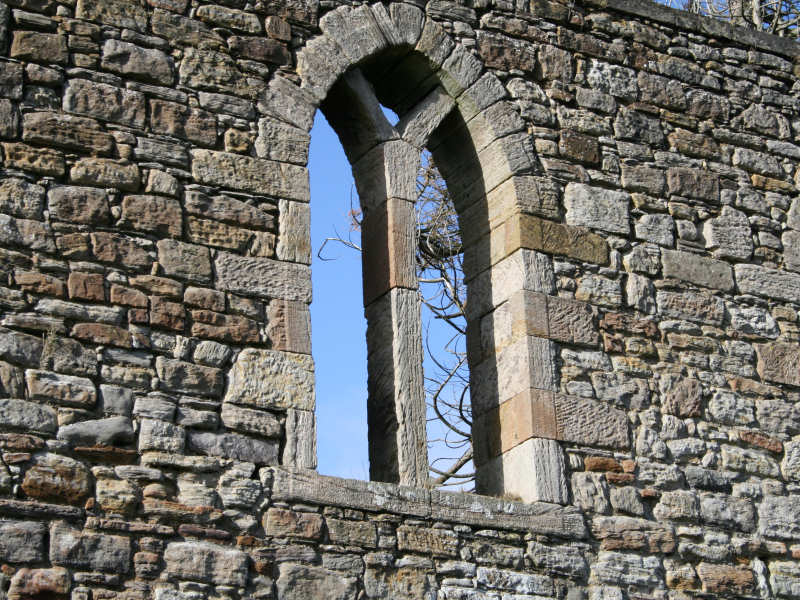
One of the surviving gothic-style windows in 2008

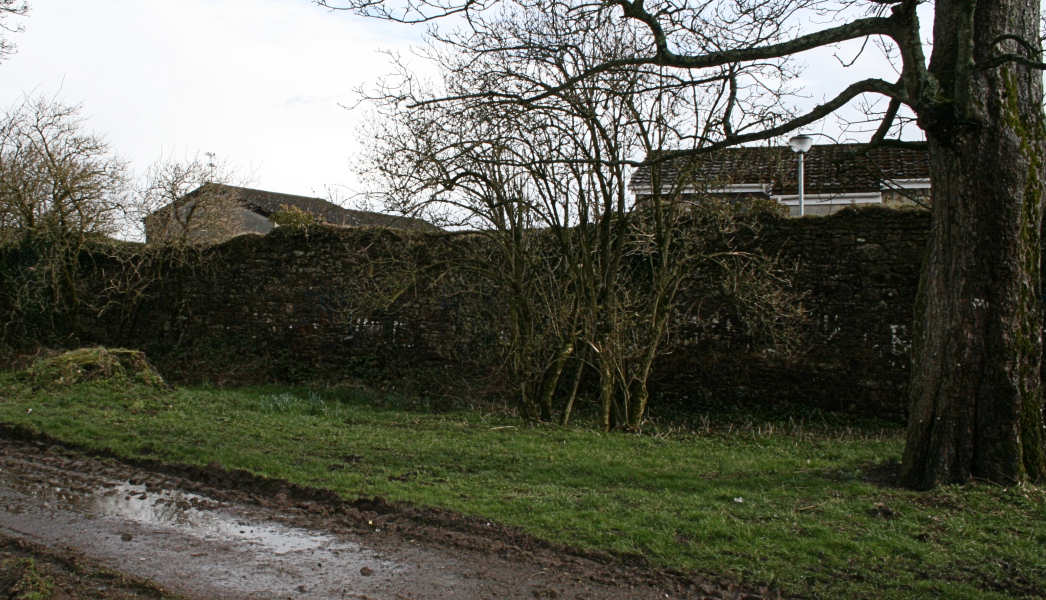
The last remnants of the castle's walled garden in 2008

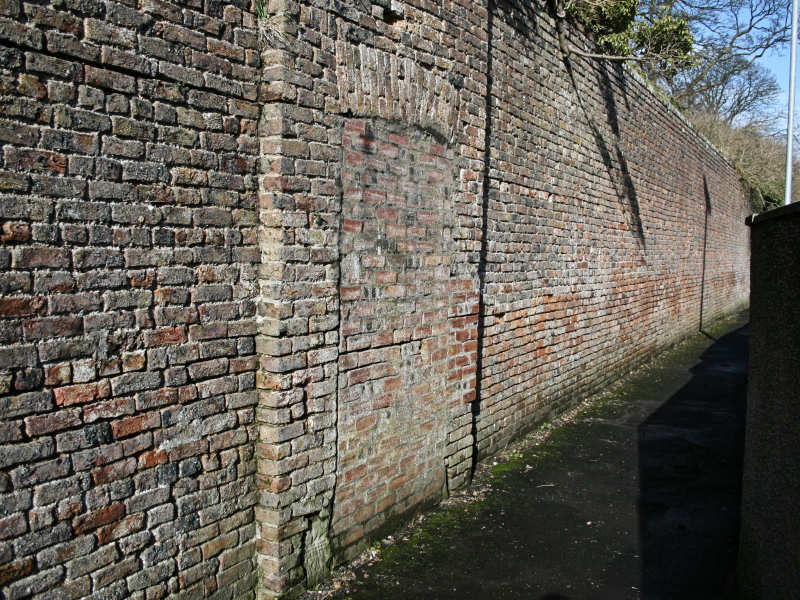
A bricked up entrance to the former walled garden in 2008

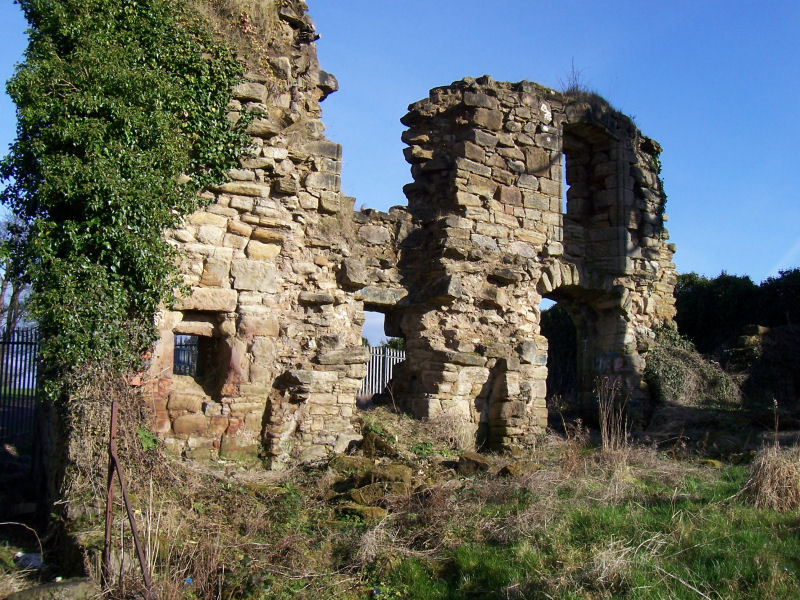
The remains of the eastern castle wall in 2006

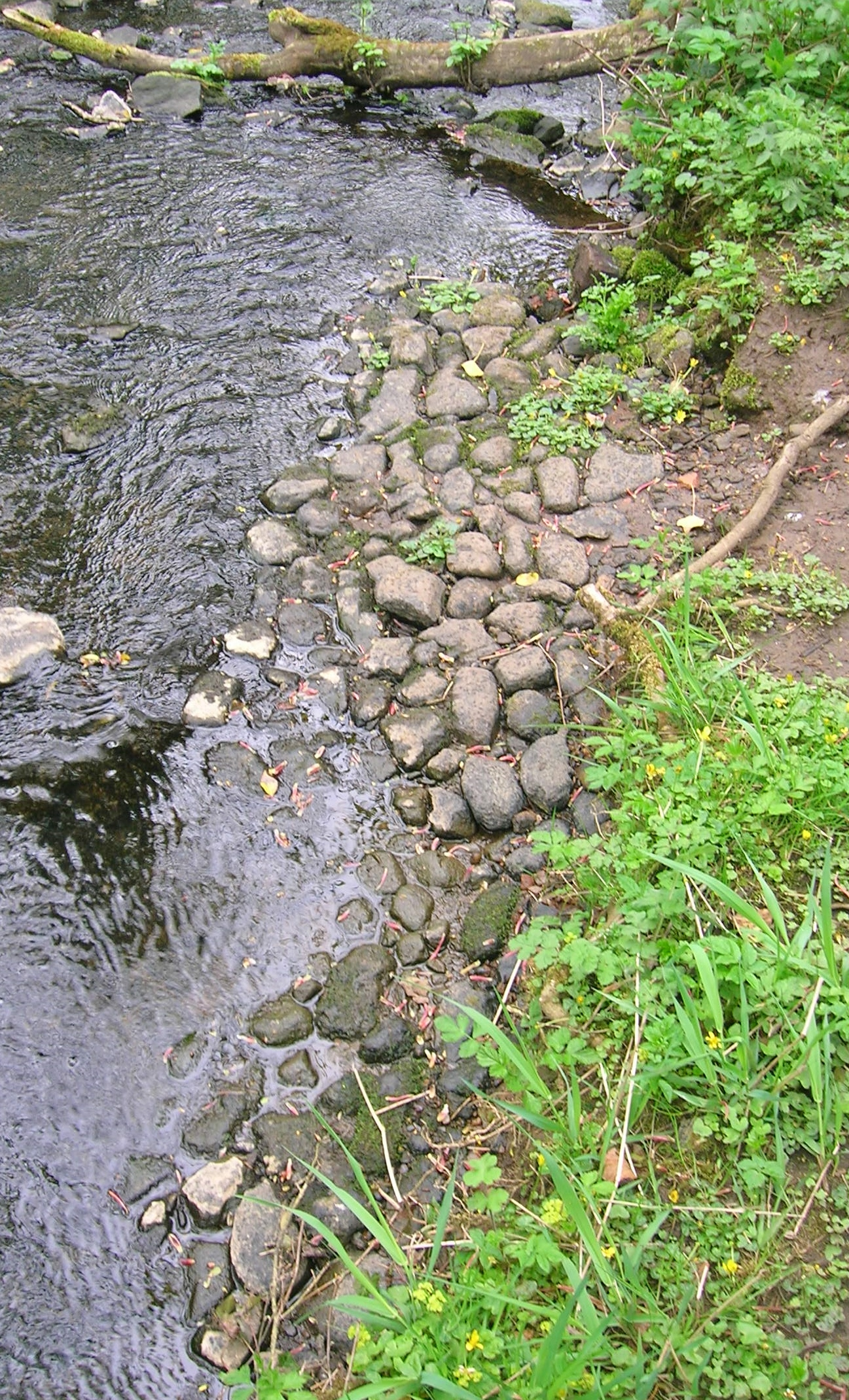
Remains of the old ford.

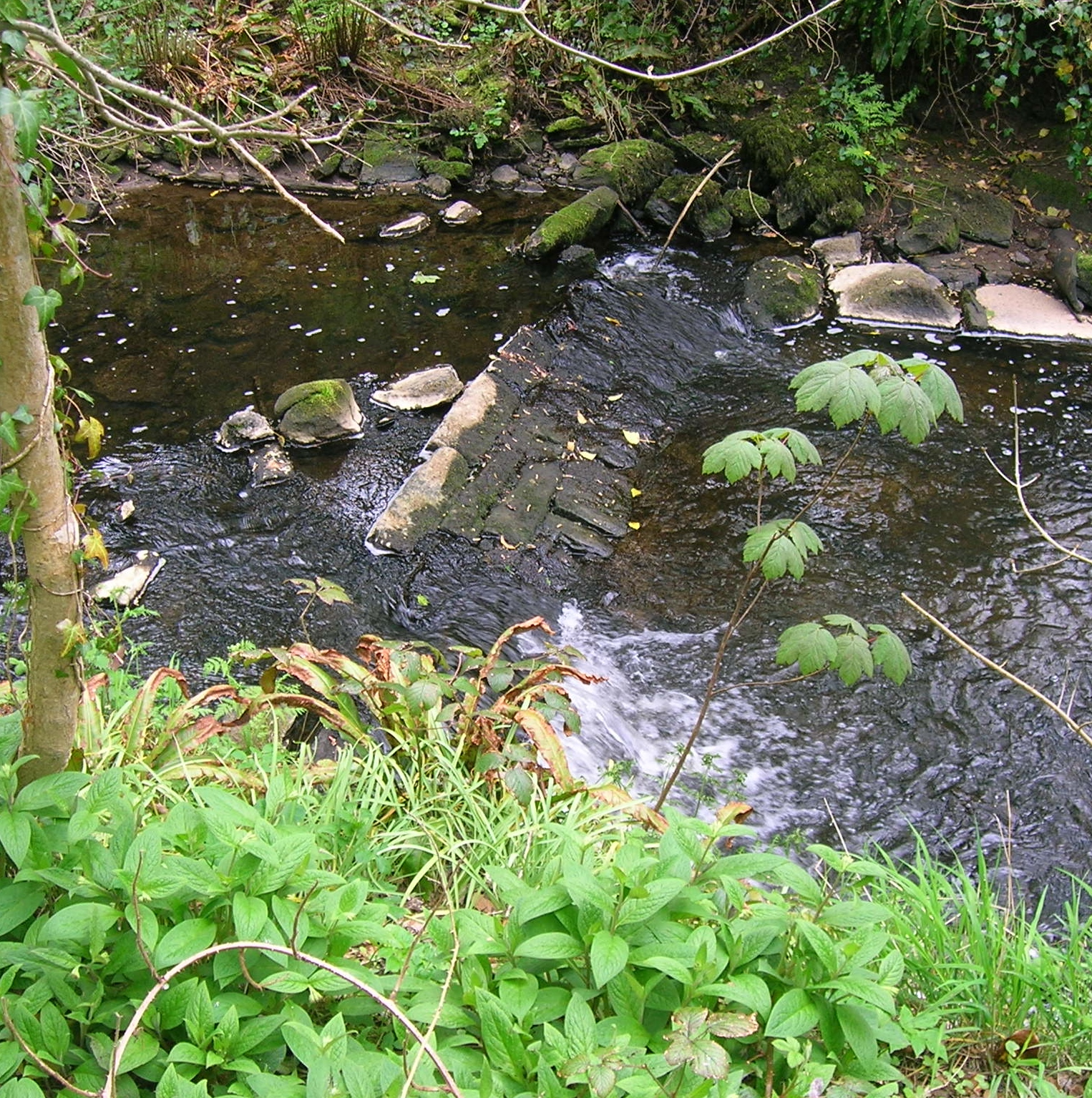
The weir on the Stevenston Burn in the Kerelaw Glen
