= Cunynghame baronets =

Baronetcy in the Baronetage of Nova Scotia

Cunynghame Baronetcy, of Milncraig
- Arms of the Cunynghame baronets of Milncraig
- Creation date: 3 February 1702
- Baronetage: Baronetage of Nova Scotia
- Status: Extant
- Motto: Per varios casus

The Cunynghame Baronetcy, of Milncraig in the County of Ayr, is a title in the Baronetage of Nova Scotia. It was created on 3 February 1702 for the Scottish lawyer and politician David Cunynghame, with remainder to his "heirs male in perpetuum". He was the member of a family that claimed descent from the second son of Alexander Cunningham, 1st Earl of Glencairn. The second and fourth Baronets both represented Linlithgowshire in the British House of Commons while the third Baronet was a Lieutenant-General in the British Army. Another member of the family to gain distinction was Sir Arthur Augustus Thurlow Cunynghame, fifth son of the fifth Baronet. He was a General in the British Army.

== Cunynghame baronets, of Milncraig (1702) ==
- Sir David Cunynghame, 1st Baronet (died 28 January 1708)
- Sir James Cunynghame, 2nd Baronet (c. 1685–1747)
- Sir David Cunynghame, 3rd Baronet (1700–1767)
- Sir William Augustus Cunynghame, 4th Baronet (1747–1828)
- Sir David Cunynghame, 5th Baronet (1769–1854)
- Sir David Thurlow Cunynghame, 6th Baronet (1803–1869)
- Sir Edward Augustus Cunynghame, 7th Baronet (1839–1877)
- Sir Francis Thurlow Cunynghame, 8th Baronet (1808–1877)
- Sir Francis George Thurlow Cunynghame, 9th Baronet (1835–1900)
- Sir Percy Cunynghame, 10th Baronet (1867–1941)
- Sir (Henry) David St Leger Brooke Selwyn Cunynghame, 11th Baronet (1905–1978), a film producer who married the actress Pamela Stanley
- Sir Andrew David Francis Cunynghame, 12th Baronet (b. 1942).

The heir presumptive is the present holder's younger brother John Phillip Henry Michael Selwyn Cunynghame (b. 1944).

== See also ==
- Earl of Glencairn
- Cunningham baronets
- Montgomery-Cuninghame baronets
