= Kerelaw House =

Coordinates: 55.6490°N 4.7543°W

Kerelaw House was part of the former Kerelaw Estate situated on the west coast of Ayrshire, Scotland, in the town of Stevenston.

== History ==
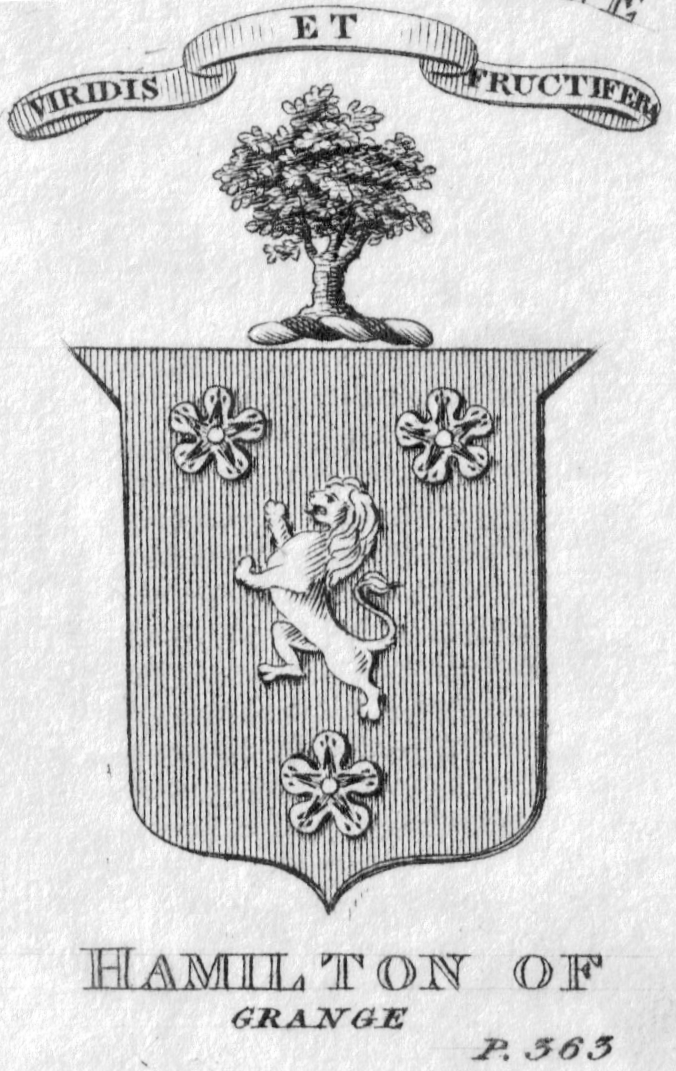
Coat of Arms of the Hamiltons of Grange.

The house was built in the neo-Palladian style in 1787 by Lieut.-Col. Alexander Hamilton (a relative of one of the Founding Fathers of the United States of the same name). Hamilton died in 1837 without issue and left considerable debts. Gavin Fullarton, Esq., a retired West Indies merchant, in 1838 along with the rest of the Kerelaw Estate including Kerelaw Castle. The Fullarton family were a cadet branch of the ancient family of the Fullartons of Kirkmichael, in Arran, who held their charter from the days of Robert the Bruce. The family were hereditary Crowners (Coroners) in the island of Arran. Their family motto was Lux in tenebris., The light shineth in darkness.

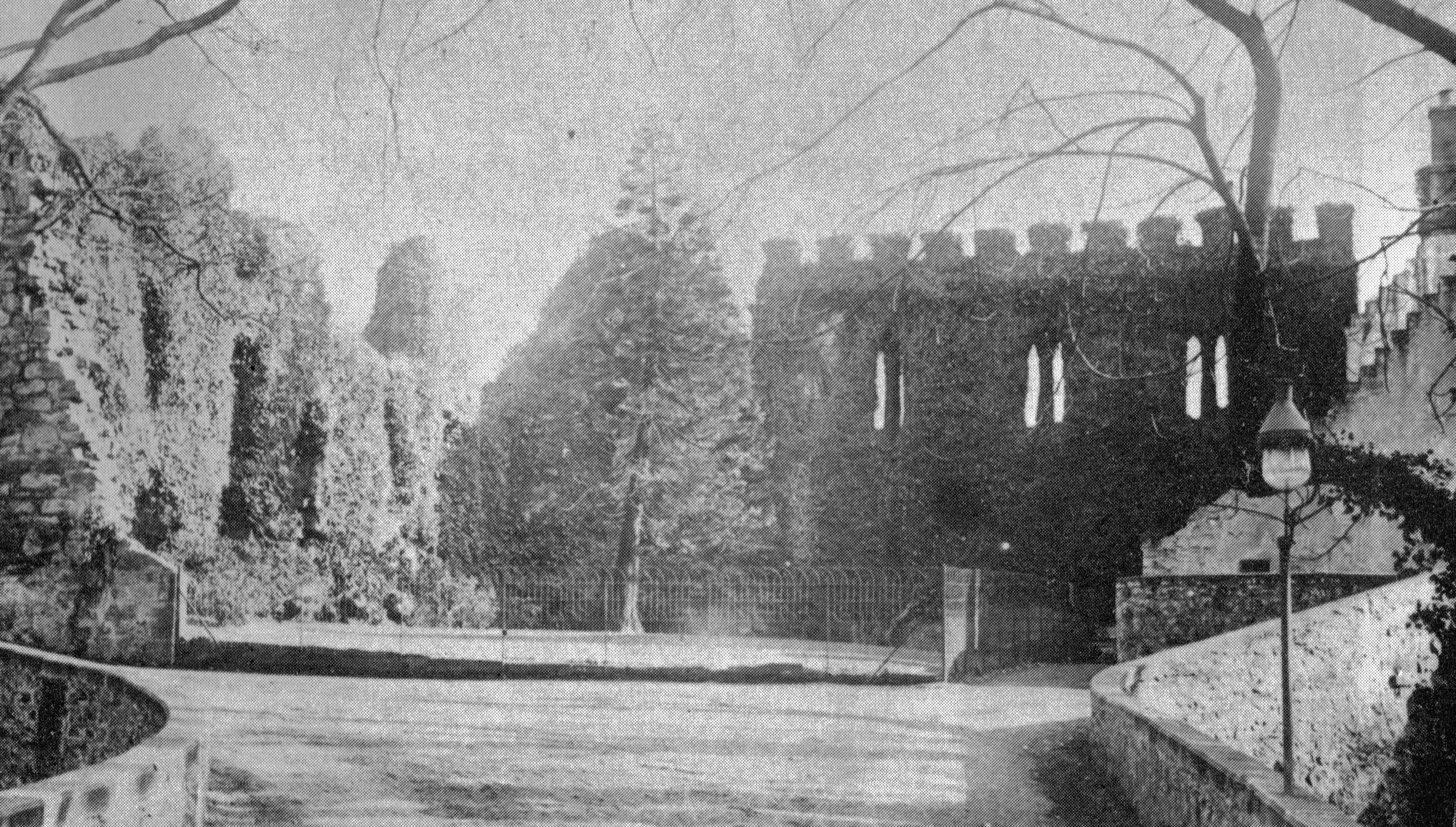
Kerelaw castle ruins in 1890 with the Laburnum tree reputed to have been sent by David Livingstone from Africa.

In 1919 the house was bought by James Campbell, WS. Campbell and his family (including his son Kenneth Campbell VC) were the last family to live at Kerelaw; in 1969 the house was bought by Glasgow Corporation Education Department and Kerelaw Residential School was opened in its grounds in 1970. The house was intended to be used as offices for the school, but was instead demolished.

== Description ==
Built in the Adam style, Kerelaw House was a tall, three-storey ashlar building of five bays with a wide, slightly projecting central bay; its Doric entrance porch has above it the typical Adam feature of a Serlian window set within a lightly recessed blind arch. A long driveway leads up to the house from the nearby road, and is still in existence, having latterly been used as an entrance to Kerelaw Residential School. There is, however, no other trace of the house.

Mayville House

Davis refers to this property as an exceptionally attractive and delightful little mansion, built around 1720 for Robert Baillie, father of Lesley Baillie, Burns's 'Bonnie Lesley'. The property became part of the Kerelaw Estate until sold by Mr James Campbell in 1914.

Hullerhirst House

This small 18th-century dwelling was probably a dower house for Kerelaw House.
