= James Cunningham, 14th Earl of Glencairn =

Scottish nobleman, soldier and patron of Robert Burns

James Cunningham
- 14th Earl of Glencairn
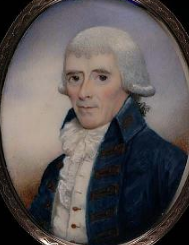
- Known for: patron of Robert Burns
- Born: 1 June 1749
- Died: 30 January 1791 (aged 41)

James Cunningham, 14th Earl of Glencairn (1 June 1749 – 30 January 1791) was a Scottish nobleman, soldier and patron of Robert Burns.

Finlaystone House and estate in Inverclyde was the seat of the Earl of Glencairn and chief of clan Cunningham from 1405 to 1796.

== Biography ==
James the second son of William, 13th Earl, was born in Kilmacolm, Renfrewshire. On the death vida patris of his elder brother William in 1768, he became Lord Kilmaurs; he succeeded to the Earldom, while on a tour of Norway, Lapland and Sweden, when his father died on 9 September 1775.

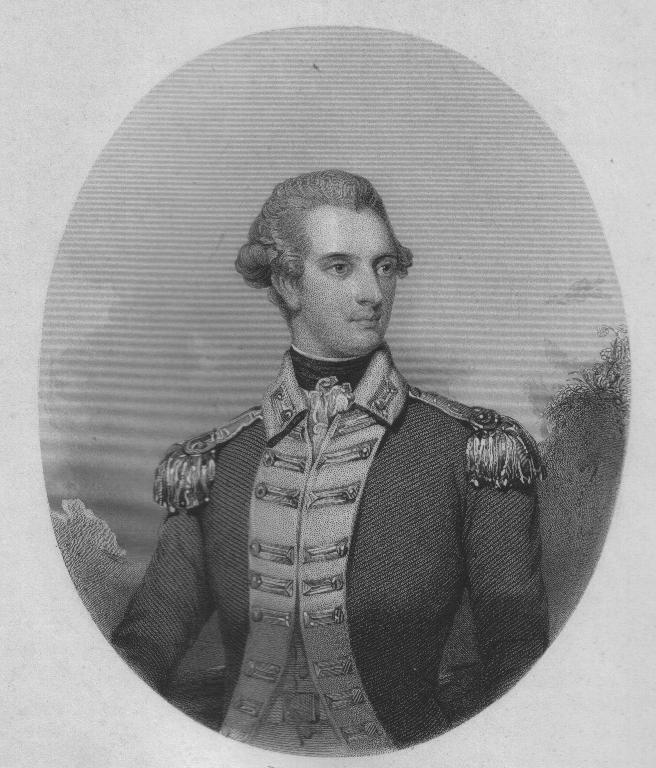
James Cunninghame, 14th Earl of Glencairn

A Captain in the Western Fencibles Regiment from 1778, he served as one of the 16 Scottish representative peers from 1780 to 1784 and supported Fox's India Bill in 1783. In 1786 he sold his ancient family estate and former seat of Kilmaurs (the Cunninghams having moved their seat to Finlaystone in the 13th century) to Henrietta Scott later to become the Marchioness of Titchfield.

He is best remembered for his friendship with Robert Burns to whom he gave his patronage. He was instrumental in the production of the Second Edition of Burn's Poems (Hill MDCCXL).

He died, unmarried, from consumption at Falmouth, soon after landing from Lisbon, where he had been wintering in the warmer winter clime. He was buried in the chancel of the Church of King Charles the Martyr, Falmouth. Upon his death Burns wrote a Lament beginning, "The wind blew hollow frae the hills," and ending with the lines, "But I'll remember thee, Glencairn, and a' that thou hast done for me."

Glencairn was succeeded in the peerage by his brother John.

James is commemorated by a brass plaque in the Cunningham Earls of Glencairn's ancestral burial vault, the Glencairn Aisle, St Maurs-Glencairn Church, in Kilmaurs, East Ayrshire.

== See also ==
- Lambroughton

Peerage of Scotland
Preceded by William Cunningham	Earl of Glencairn; 1775–1791	Succeeded by John Cunningham
