= Sir James Cunynghame, 2nd Baronet =

Scottish politician

Sir James Cunynghame, 2nd Baronet (c. 1685 – 1747) of Milncraig, Ayr and Livingstone, Linlithgow, was a Scottish politician who sat in the House of Commons from 1715 to 1722.

Cunynghame was the eldest son of Sir David Cunynghame, 1st Baronet of Milncraig and Livingstone and his first wife Isabella Dalrymple, daughter of James Dalrymple, 1st Viscount of Stair. He succeeded his father in the baronetcy on 28 January 1708.

Cunynghame was returned unopposed as Whig Member of Parliament for Linlithgowshire at the 1715 general election. He was defeated in 1722 and in a later attempt in 1734.

Cunynghame died unmarried on 1 February 1747. He was succeeded in the baronetcy by his brother, David, a Lieutenant-General in the Army.

Parliament of Great Britain
Preceded by John Houston	Member of Parliament for Linlithgowshire; 1715 – 1722	Succeeded by George Dundas
Baronetage of Nova Scotia
Preceded by David Cunynghame	Baronet (of Milncraig); 1708-1747	Succeeded by David Cunynghame
