= Sir David Cunynghame, 1st Baronet =

Scottish lawyer and politician

Sir David Cunyninghame of Milncraig, 1st Baronet (died 28 January 1708) was a Scottish landowner, lawyer and politician. He was a distinguished advocate, an eloquent commissioner to Parliament, and the friend and coadjutor of Andrew Fletcher of Saltoun. He was created a baronet of Nova Scotia on 3 February 1702, to him and his "heirs successive".

A son of David Cunynghame of Milncraig (died 1659) by his spouse, Margaret, daughter of John Masoun of Rosebank, Burgh Clerk of Ayr, his paternal inherited estates were Milncraig, Ayrshire, and Livingston, West Lothian.

Sir David married, firstly, to Isobell, youngest daughter of Sir James Dalrymple, 1st Viscount of Stair. He married, secondly, on 16 March 1698, to Elizabeth, daughter of Sir Robert Baird, 1st Baronet of Saughtonhall.

== Successors ==
He was succeeded by his eldest son, Sir James Cunynghame of Milncraig, 2nd Baronet, Member of Parliament for Linlithgowshire (1715–1722), who died unmarried on 1 February 1747. He was succeeded in the baronetcy by his brother, David, a Lieutenant-General in the Army.

Parliament of Scotland
Preceded by David Maitland	Burgh Commissioner for Lauder; 1702–1707	Succeeded by Acts of Union 1707
Baronetage of Nova Scotia
New creation	Baronet (of Milncraig); 1702–1708	Succeeded by James Cunynghame
