= Finlaystone House =

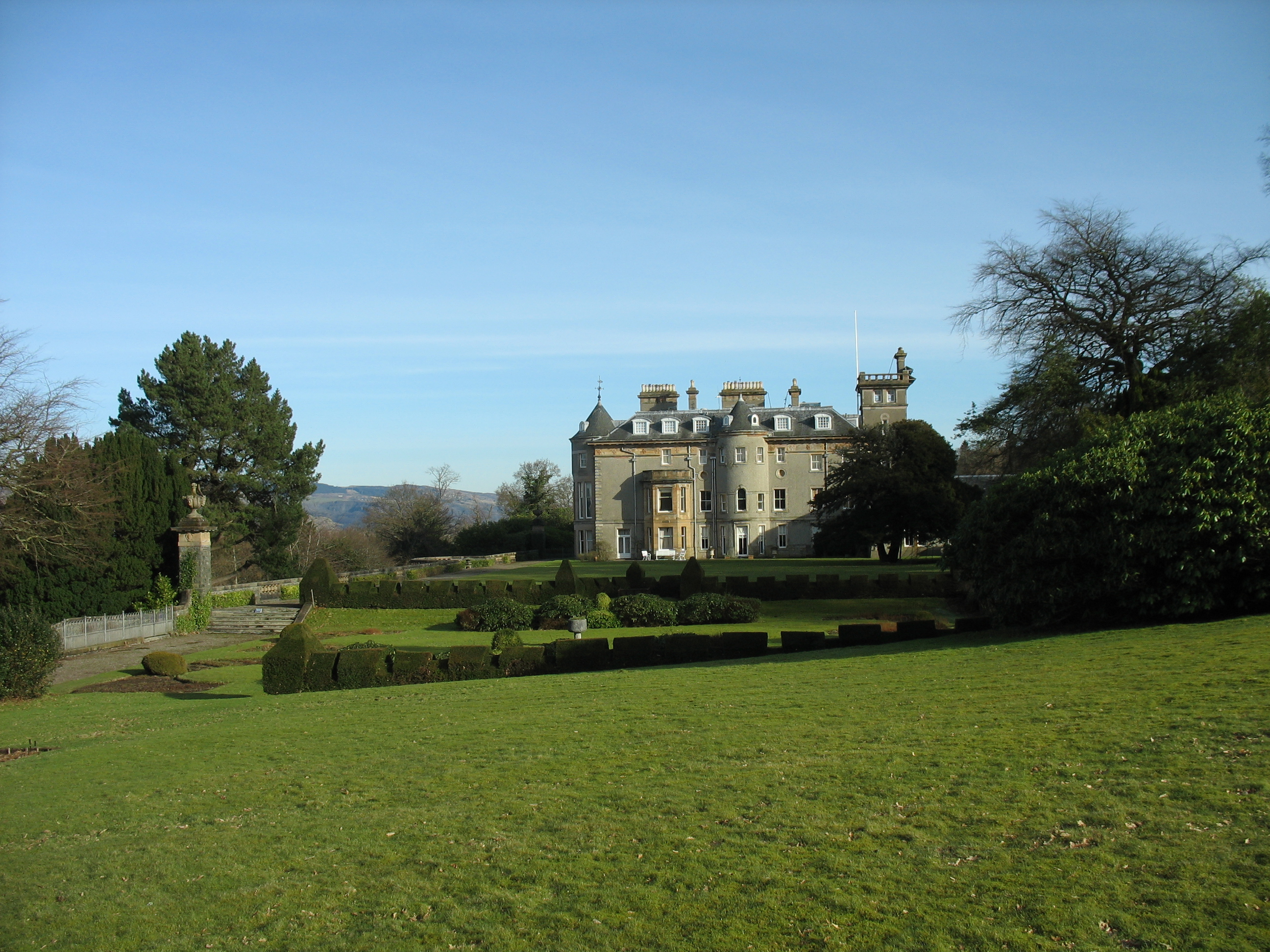
- Finlaystone House, west front

- Location of Finlaystone House in Inverclyde
- 55.9287°N 4.6191°W

Listed Building – Category A
- Designated: 10 June 1971
- Reference no.: LB13641

Inventory of Gardens and Designed Landscapes in Scotland
- Official name: Finlaystone House
- Designated: 1 July 1987
- Reference no.: GDL00180

Finlaystone House is a mansion and estate in the Inverclyde council area and historic county of Renfrewshire. It lies near the southern bank of the Firth of Clyde, beside the village of Langbank, in the west central Lowlands of Scotland.

Finlaystone was a property of the Dennistoun family, and passed to the Cunninghams in the 15th century. It was the seat of the Earl of Glencairn until 1796, and is now the property of the Chief of Clan MacMillan. The house is protected as a category A listed building, and the grounds are included in the Inventory of Gardens and Designed Landscapes in Scotland, the national listing of significant gardens.

== History ==
In the late 14th century, King Robert II confirmed a grant of the lands of Finlaystone to Sir John de Danyelstoun (Dennistoun). He was succeeded by his son, Sir Robert, who was keeper of Dumbarton Castle. When he died in 1399 his estates were divided between his daughters. Elizabeth inherited Newark Castle, while Margaret inherited Finlaystone.

In 1405 Margaret married Sir William Cunningham, whose family held the estate as the seat of Clan Cunningham until the 19th century. William's grandson Alexander Lord Kilmaurs (1426–1488) was created Earl of Glencairn in 1488. The family were supporters of the Scottish Reformation, hosting the world's first Protestant Reformed communion service by the preacher John Knox in 1556.

The architect John Douglas was commissioned to design a new house in 1746, but building works were not carried out until 1764. The new house incorporated part of the 15th-century castle. In 1796, the 15th Earl of Glencairn Lord Kilmaurs, Chief of Clan Cunningham, died without issue, and Finlaystone passed to a cousin, Robert Graham of Gartmore, whose family took the name Cunninghame Graham.

The Cunninghame Grahams sold Finlaystone in 1862 to Sir David Carrick-Buchanan, who in turn sold it in 1882 to George Jardine Kidston. Kidston commissioned the architect John James Burnet to carry out a Scots Baronial style remodelling of the house, completed in 1903. The grounds of the house were extended and planted during the early 20th century. Kidston's granddaughter Marian married General Sir Gordon MacMillan, Chieftain of the Clan MacMillan.

== Country Estate ==
The estate is managed through a ranger service as a visitor attraction with marked walks, a visitor centre, toilet facilities, play areas and frequent monthly and annual events. The estate is split between 10 acres (4.0 ha) gardens, 140 acres (57 ha) woodlands and multiple other properties.

== See also ==
- List of Category A listed buildings in Inverclyde
