= John Cunningham, 15th Earl of Glencairn =

Scottish nobleman, cavalry officer and priest

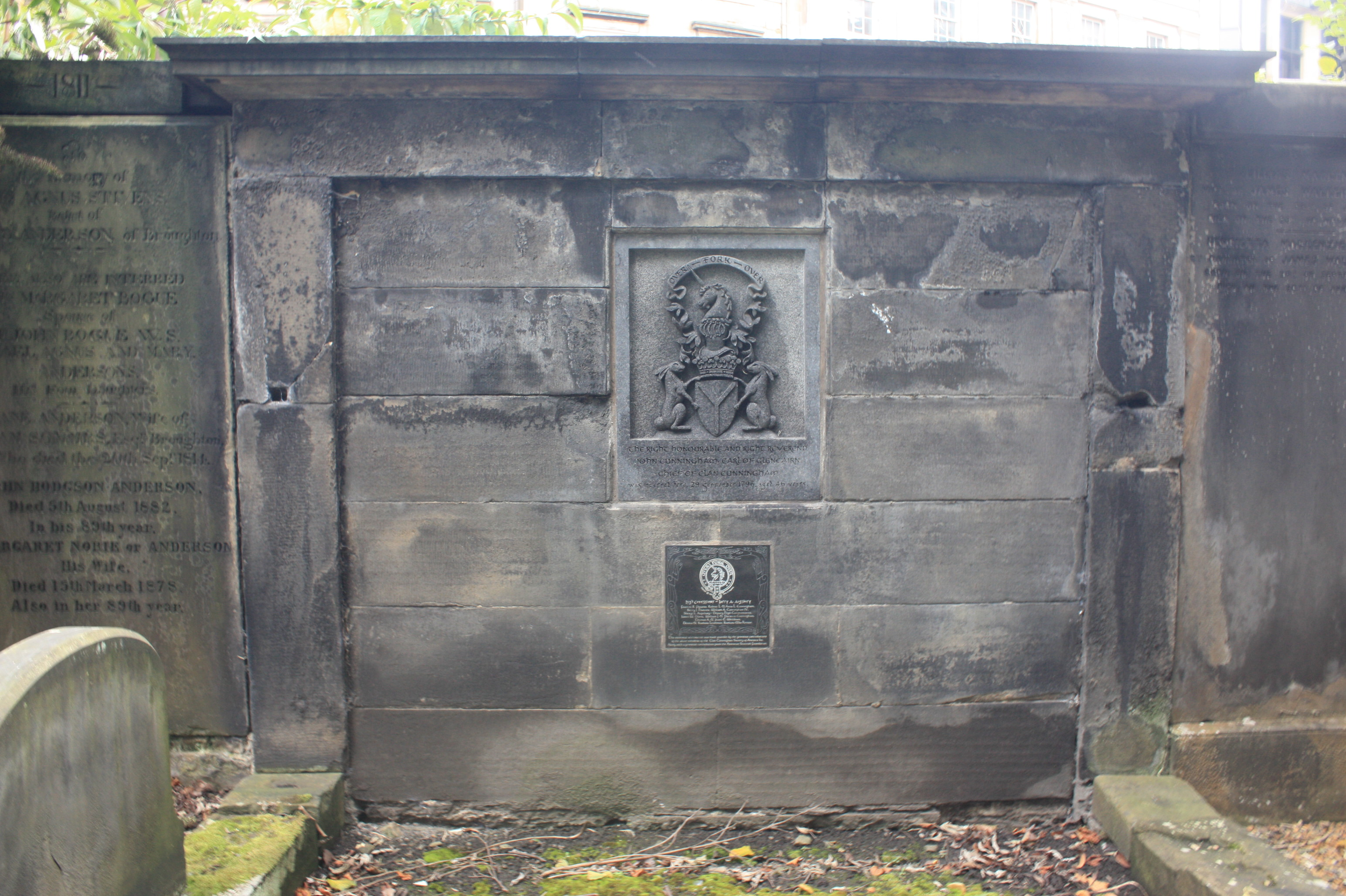
Cunningham monument, St Cuthberts, Edinburgh

John Cunningham, 15th Earl of Glencairn (1749 – 24 September 1796) was a Scottish nobleman, cavalry officer, and finally a priest.

The younger son of William Cunningham, 13th Earl of Glencairn (d. 1775) he succeeded his elder brother James, one of the Scottish representative peers, upon his death, unmarried, in Falmouth in 1790.

Finlaystone House and estate in Inverclyde was the seat of the Earl of Glencairn and chief of clan Cunningham from 1405 to 1796.

For some time Lord John Cunningham was an officer in the 14th Royal Dragoons, but afterwards entered into Holy Orders of the Church of England.

He died at Coats House, then west of the city of Edinburgh (now absorbed), in his 47th year.

In 1785 he had married Isabel, daughter of Henry David Erskine, 10th Earl of Buchan (d. 1767), and widow of William Leslie Hamilton. They had no issue and the title became dormant.

He is buried against the south-west wall in St Cuthberts Churchyard in Edinburgh.

Peerage of Scotland
Preceded by James Cunningham	Earl of Glencairn; 1791–1796	Dormant
