= Earl of Glencairn =

Dormant Scottish earldom

Earldom of Glencairn
- Arms of Cunningham
- Creation date: 28 May 1488
- First holder: Alexander Cunningham, 1st Lord Kilmaurs
- Last holder: John Cunningham, 15th Earl of Glencairn
- Remainder to: Heirs general
- Subsidiary titles: Lord Kilmaurs (1469)
- Status: Dormant
- Former seats: Finlaystone House; Kilmaurs Place
- Motto: OVER FORK OVER
- Arms: Argent, a shakefork sable
- Crest: A unicorn's head couped argent, armed or
- Supporters: Two cunnings (coneys) proper

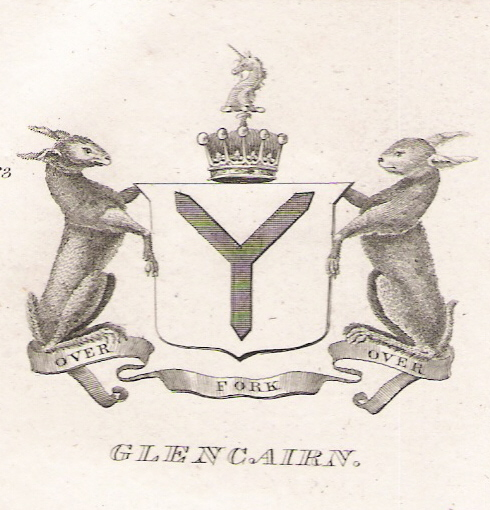
Arms of the Earls of Glencairn as recorded in Brown's Peerage, 1834

Modern depiction of the Arms of the Earls of Glencairn.

Earl of Glencairn was a title in the Peerage of Scotland. King James III created the title in 1488 by royal charter for Alexander Cunningham, 1st Lord Kilmaurs. He held the earldom just two weeks before he and the king were killed at the Battle of Sauchieburn.

The name was taken from the parish of Glencairn in Dumfriesshire, so named for the Cairn Waters which run through it.

The title became dormant on the death of the fifteenth earl in 1796, with no original royal charter existing, nor a given remainder in the various confirmations in title of previous earls.

Shortly after, the earldom was unsuccessfully claimed by Sir Adam Fergusson of Kilkerran, Bt., as heir of the line of Alexander, 10th Earl of Glencairn, great-great-grandson of the 10th Earl's daughter Lady Margaret Cunningham (c.1662–1742) with her husband John Maitland, 5th Earl of Lauderdale. His claim was opposed by Sir Walter Montgomery-Cuninghame, 4th Baronet, as presumed heir male, along with Lady Henriet Don, sister of the last earl, and wife of Sir Alexander Don of Newton Don, Roxburghshire. The House of Lords Committee of Privileges on 14 July 1797, chaired by the Lord Chancellor (Lord Rosslyn), in deciding the claim of the first-named, took a view unfavourable to all the claimants, and adjudged, that while Sir Adam Fergusson had shown himself to be the heir-general of Alexander, 10th Earl of Glencairn who died in 1670, he had not made out his right to the title. However, the decision was severely criticised by the jurist John Riddell in the 19th century and by Sir Iain Moncreiffe of that Ilk, Officer of Arms, in the 20th.

== Earls of Glencairn (1488) ==
The coat of arms of the Cuninghames, Earls of Glencairn as recorded in 1820 (Robertson)

- Alexander Cunningham, 1st Earl of Glencairn (1426–1488)
- Robert Cunningham, 2nd Earl of Glencairn, According to the Scottish Code of Heraldry, the title, Earl of Glencairn, passed from father, Alexander, to his son Robert, upon his death, 11 June 1488, establishing Robert Cuninghame, the 2nd Earl of Glencairn. On 17 October 1488, at the behest of King James IV, Parliament passed the Act of Recissory, annulling all dignities granted by King James III after 2 February 1488. This Act deprived Robert of the title and rights granted to the Earldom of Glencairn. In 1505 Parliament passed the Act Revocatory, and the Earldom of Glencairn was restored upon the Cuninghame Family of Kilmaurs. (Cuthbert Cuninghame, 3rd Earl of Glencairn, 3rd Lord Kilmaurs.)
- Cuthbert Cunningham, 3rd Earl of Glencairn (c. 1476 – c. 1541)
- William Cunningham, 4th Earl of Glencairn (c. 1490–1547)
- Alexander Cunningham, 5th Earl of Glencairn (died 1574)
- William Cunningham, 6th Earl of Glencairn (1526–1580)
- James Cunningham, 7th Earl of Glencairn (1552–1630)
- William Cunningham, 8th Earl of Glencairn (1575–1631)
- William Cunningham, 9th Earl of Glencairn (1610–1664)
- Alexander Cunningham, 10th Earl of Glencairn (died without male issue, 1670).
- John Cunningham, 11th Earl of Glencairn (died 1703) succeeded his brother and matriculated the arms in 1672.
- William Cunningham, 12th Earl of Glencairn (died 1734)
- William Cunningham, 13th Earl of Glencairn (died 1775)
- James Cunningham, 14th Earl of Glencairn (1749–1791), was unmarried and died without issue; succeeded by his brother.
- John Cunningham, 15th Earl of Glencairn (1750–1796), died without issue.

== See also ==
- Cunynghame baronets
- Montgomery-Cuninghame barons
