= Alexander Cunningham, 1st Earl of Glencairn =

Scottish nobleman

- Earl of Glencairn
- Tenure: 1488
- Successor: Robert Cunningham, 2nd Earl of Glencairn
- Other titles: Lord of Kilmaurs

Alexander Cuninghame, 1st Earl of Glencairn, 1st Lord Kilmaurs (1426 – 11 June 1488) was a Scottish nobleman.

He became Lord of Kilmaurs on 8 February 1464 and Earl of Glencairn on 28 May 1488

Alexander of Kilmaurs succeeded his father before 20 March 1451, when he granted to the Friars-Preachers of Glasgow a yearly sum of four and a half merks from the lands of Finlaystone for masses on behalf of his grandfather and grandmother.

Alexander was of the Court of King James II, while on his expedition to the south country against James, 9th and last Earl of Douglas. On 18 July 1452, he went into the tent of Lord Chancellor of Scotland (Crichton), where he resigned into the King's hands his lands in Ayr including Kilmaurs, as well as the sheriffdom of Ayr, and the lands of Kilmarnock in Stirling, Finlaystone in Renfrew, Glencairn in Dumfries, and Hilton in Berwick. After a pause, King James II regranted and gave the said lands to Alexander and his heirs.

In 1458 Alexander acted as Bailie of Cunningham in 1458. Alexander was subsequently accused of having dealings with the traitor Earl of Douglas, and on 13 January 1464, he complained to the King in Parliament that there was a rumor that he had assisted James of Douglas, notwithstanding a letter of 8 February 1463, from King James III declaring him innocent. He then offered purgation by a court of his peers, by the purgation of 100 knights and esquires, or to defend himself according to the laws of arms. Parliament declared him innocent.

That is the first reference to Alexander as Lord Kilmaurs, a dignity to which he had been raised between 8 February 1463, the date of the royal letter, where he is styled Alexander Cunynghame, Lord of Kilmaurs, and 13 January 1464, when as Lord Kilmaurs he complained in Parliament.

On 15 October 1464, Alexander witnessed a charter ' Alexander Dominus Kilmaurs. On 13 January 1478, he had a charter as Alexander Dominus de Kilmaweris of his lands of Drips, in the lordship of Kilbride, Lanark. Alexander sat continually in Parliament as Lord Kilmaurs from 1464 to 1488.

In 1488 a great part of the Scottish nobles rebelled against King James III, on 2 February 1488, the prince his son, then about sixteen years of age, left Stirling Castle and joined the rebels. Alexander, Lord Kilmaurs, who was then very powerful, brought his forces to aid the King's party and assisted in the defeat of the rebels at Battle of Blackness. For his service, and as a mark of Royal favor, Alexander Cuninghame, Lord Kilmaurs was, on 28 May 1488, advanced to the dignity of Earl of Glencairn by royal charter, in which he is designated Alexander, Earl of Glencairn and Lord Kilmaurs. The words used are 'facimus et creamus eundem nostrum consanguineum Comitem in exaltationem sui honoris, perpetuis futuris temporibus Comitem de Glencairn et Dominum de Kilmauris nuncupandum.' In support of this honor, King James III, by the same deed, granted Alexander, Earl of Glencairn thirty-pound lands of Drummond and the ten-pound lands of Duchray, in the Earldom of Lennox, to be held by the Earl and his heirs and successors forever.

Alter the battle of Blackness a proposal was made for a treaty between the opposite parties, and articles were drawn up for that purpose. These articles were not observed. The prince's party accused the King and others of having entered into a treaty with England. The war broke out again, and on 11 June 1488, during the Battle of Sauchieburn near Stirling, Alexander Cuninghame, Earl of Glencairn was killed. King James III was either killed during the battle or shortly thereafter.

== Offspring ==
Known children of Alexander:

1. Robert Cunningham, 2nd Earl of Glencairn. Alexander passed his title on to him upon his death.

2. William of Craigends, ancestor of that family, and the ancestor of the Cuninghams of Robertland, Carncurin, Bedlaw, Auchinharvie, and Auchinyards. On 4 February 1479 William received from his father a charter of the lands of Craiganys (Craigends) in the lordship of Ranfurley

3. Alexander, mentioned in a charter dated 1483

4. Edward, also mentioned in a charter dated 1483

Peerage of Scotland
New creation	Earl of Glencairn; 1488	Succeeded by Robert Cunningham
