= The Lands of Lochridge =

Village in East Ayrshire, Scotland

Coordinates: 55.667°N 4.521°W

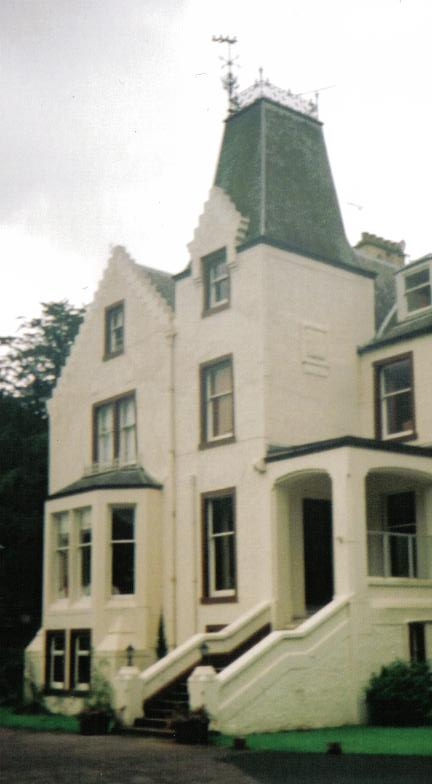
Lochridge House

The Lochridge estate was in the old feudal Baillerie of Cunninghame, near Stewarton in what is now East Ayrshire, Scotland.

== The history of Lochridge ==
=== The lairds and tenants ===
The coat of arms of the Arnot Stewarts of Lochridge

Nether Lochridge or Lochrig as it was originally known, belonged to the Arnots for nearly 400 years. The first record dates from 1441.

Captain Andrew Arnot, was the younger brother of Laird of Lochridge. He was a Covenanter and with ten others he was executed on 7 December 1666 at Edinburgh’s Mercat Cross. During the executions, their right hands were cut off and sent to Lanark, where the Covenants had been attested to during the raising by raisng their right arms.

In 1691 the Hearth Tax records show that the mansion house had seven hearths and that seven other dwellings were associated with the estate.

In 1741 Jean Galt Arnot, an heiress, married Matthew Stewart of Newton and inherited the house with its seven acres of land and then nearby Wardhead House. In 1830 however, Matthew Arnot Stewart, the last direct representative of the family, sold the estate to David Provan, a surgeon. Provan had been the personal surgeon to the rulers of Travancore in southern India and had retired from the Honourable East India Company at the age of 49, marrying in 1830 Emma Reid, the 18-year-old daughter of a Glasgow book dealer. In 1851 his son David (b.1834 d.1903) inherited and remodelled the property with much of the old house surviving 'within' the new building.

=== The Lochridge estate ===
Thomas Henderson Gollan purchased Lochridge, Wardhead, Horsemuir, Lochside and Byre Hill in 1920 and upon his demise in 1934 the property was split up and Lochridge House itself is now divided into individual flats.

Robertson (1820) shows an Upper Lochridge as well as Lochridge. This property seems to be at the site of what is now called Draffen House. Colonel Barns owned Upper Lochrig, part of Auchenharvie and Kirkland in 1820. A Hugh Wyllie who died on 22 December 1823, aged 51, is recorded on his tombstone in the Laigh Kirk churchyard in Stewarton as having lived at Over Lochridge.

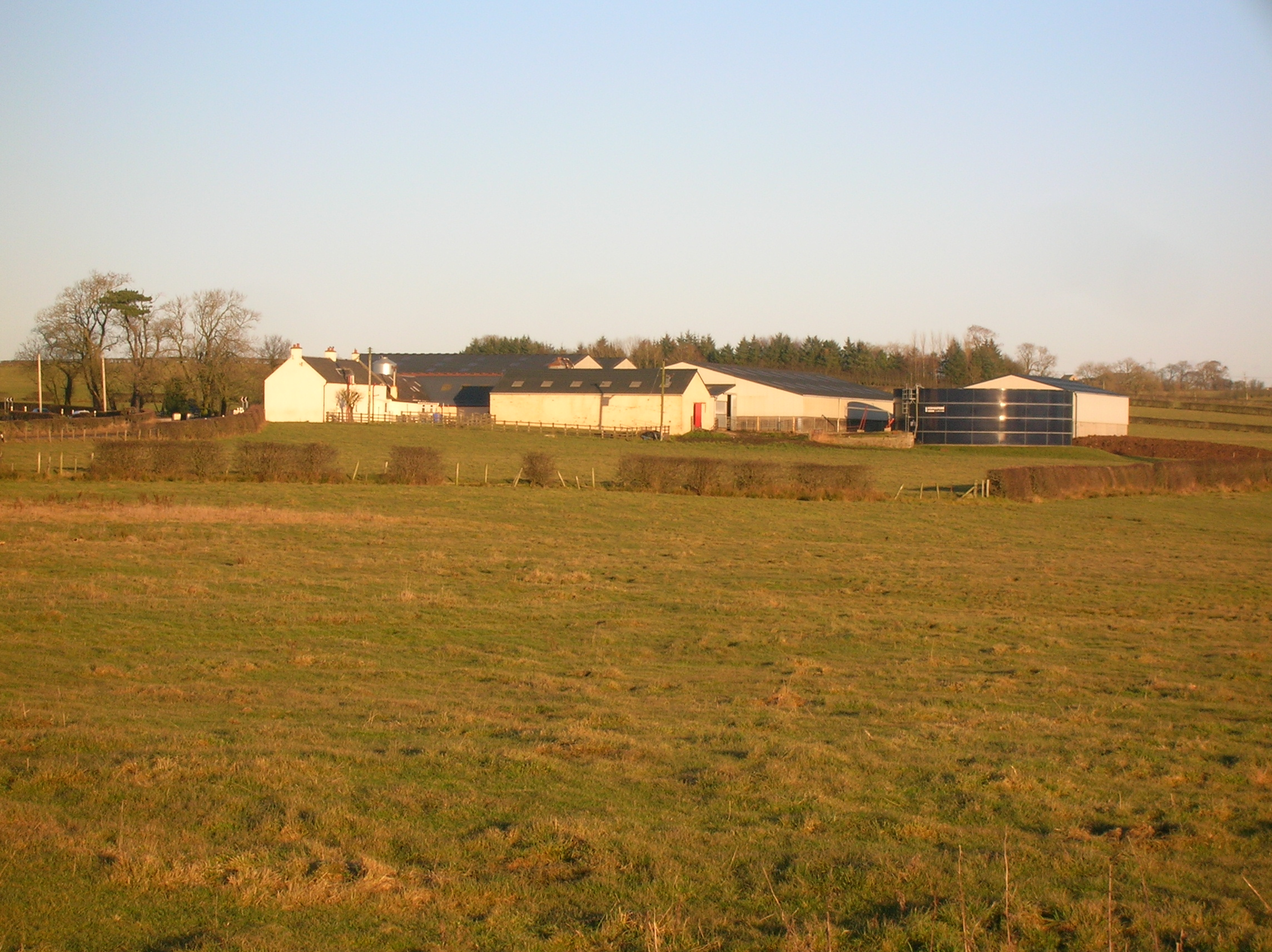
Lochside Farm

Mr. J. Proven of Lochridge attended the famous 1839 Eglinton Tournament in what is now Eglinton Country Park and he was allotted a seat in the Grand Stand.

In 1855-57 James Proven owned Peacockbank, an arable farm that is described as having an "excellent House & Steading, etc." occupied by Mrs. Dunlop.

Byre Hill Cottage was part of the estate in 1855–57. It was a Wright's business premises and a dwelling place with a large garden etc. Mr. Alexander Lindsay was the business proprietor and the tenant of the cottage. There is a Trig Point on Byre Hill.

Lochside Farm was owned by David Proven in 1855 and leased by John Templeton. An arable farm it was the site of Buiston Loch with its crannog, excavated twice.

Byre Hill Farm was owned by David Proven in 1855. I was an arable farm with house, steading etc. leased by Mt John Howie.

Lochridge Halt railway station

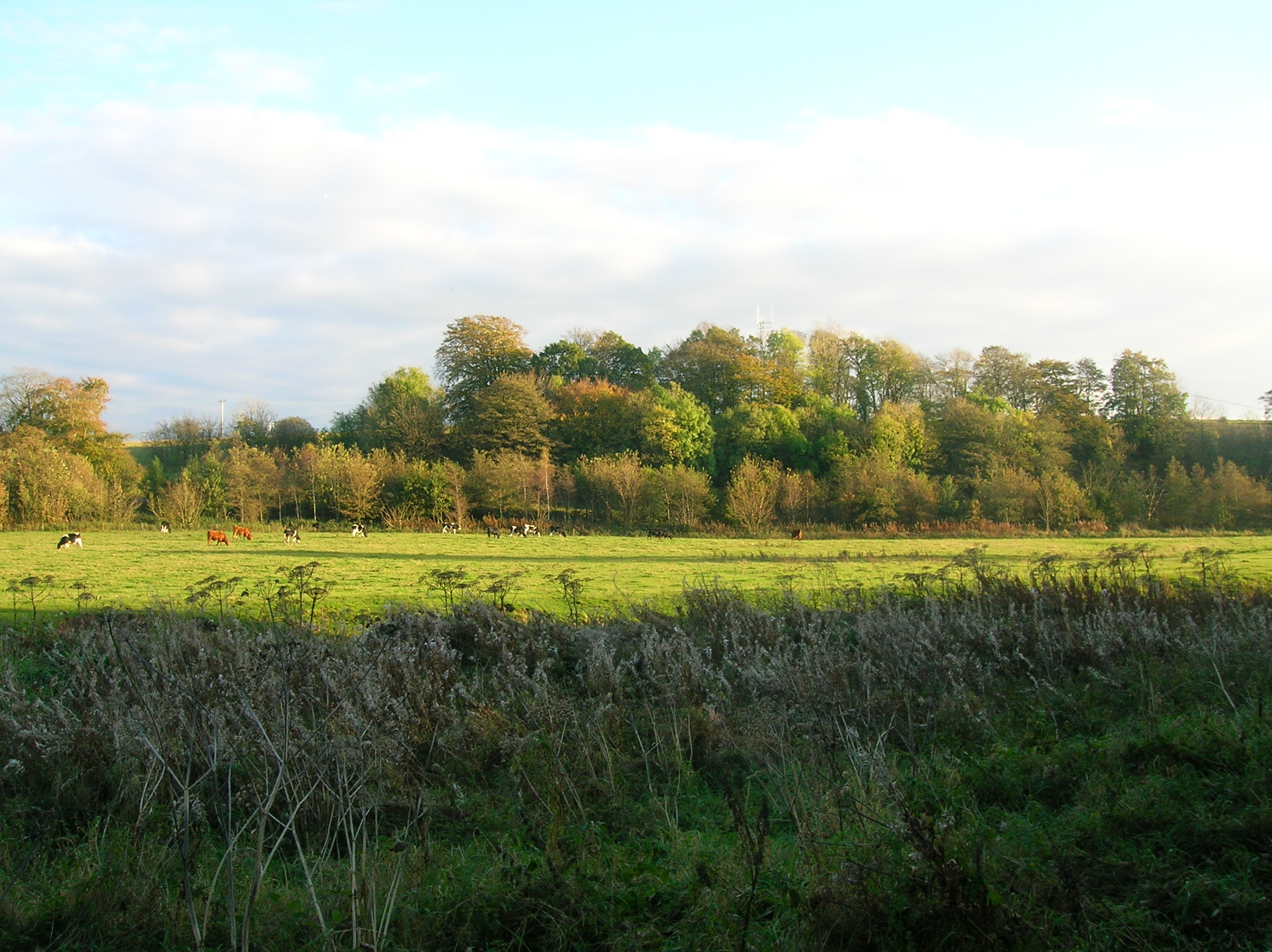
Peter's Brae woodland from below Lainshaw Castle.

A Lochridge Halt is reported to have existed on the nearby railway during WWII, probably made from railway sleepers. It was located opposite the Lochridge House gates that faced south on the side of the line that ran towards Kilmaurs and Kilmarnock.

Wardhead Park

Wardhead, next to Lochridge, was farmed by Alexander Cameron and his spouse Janet Ingram in the early 18th. century. Alexander died on 5 April 1761 and Janet died on 20 May 1736, aged 50. They were both buried at the Laigh Kirk in Stewarton.

In 1855-57 it was an arable farm with house & steading, the property of Mr. Proven of Lochridge House and tenanted by Mr. James Miller.

This was a dower house or factor's residence on the Lochridge Estate and was built around 1860. The older farmhouse building may be incorporated at the back. An old walled garden was later used as a car park. It is now the site of an engineering that manufactures wind turbines (datum 2020), previously Provan Engineering.

=== Cairn Duff ===
Cairnduff is a roughly circular Bronze Age burial cairn, located on the lands of High Peacockbank Farm that were once part of the Lochridge Estate. It was built around 3000 years ago.

== The Micro history of Lochridge ==
=== Sport ===
After World War II a 9-hole course was laid out at Lochridge but it had been abandoned between the late 1940s or the early 1950s.

The Stewarton Cricket Club had its grounds located between Lochridge and Ward Park.

=== Local history and topography ===
The term 'Lochridge' or 'Lockridge' is used as a rare surname, appearing 319 in 88.7 million of the 1997 US population.

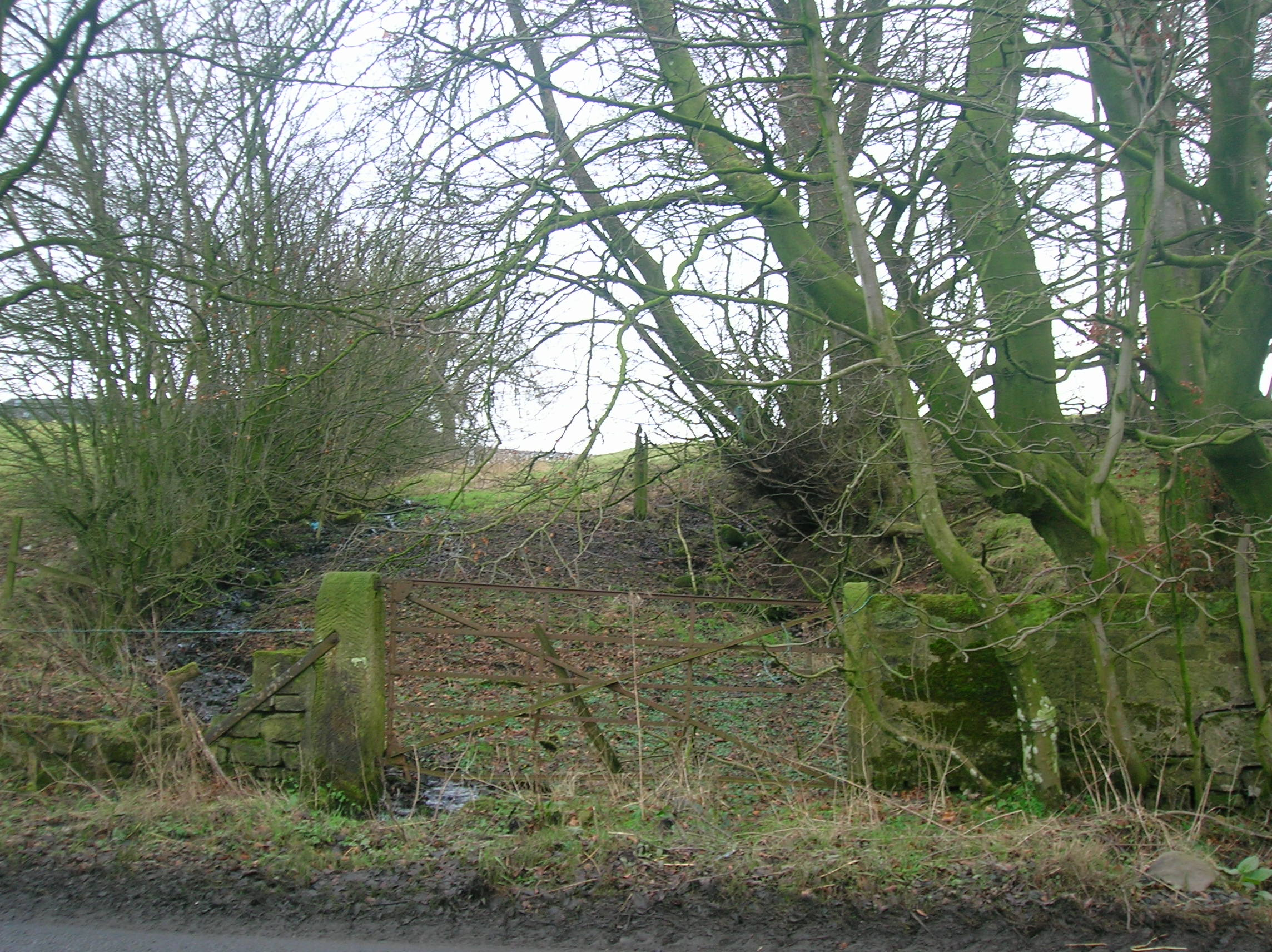
A view of the old entrance to the Lochridge driveway on the Stewarton to Cunninghamhead Road.

The road from Stewarton to Kilmaurs did not run via Lochridge until the 18th century when the Toll Road was built. The old driveway from Lochridge to Stewarton came out near Peter's Brae planting; the original entrance is still present today (2020). The course of the drive was altered when the railway was built.

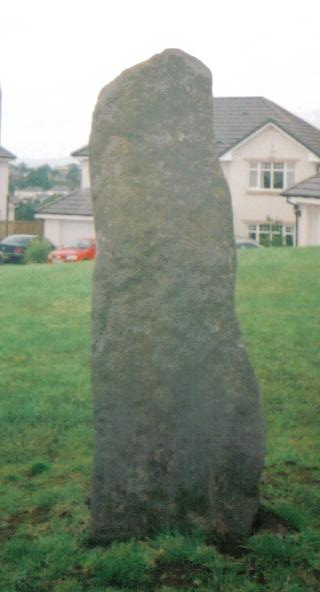
The Draffen Stone outside Draffen House; previously Upper Lochridge in Stewarton.

The estate stands on a pronounced ridge where 'rig and furrow' would have been a prominent landscape feature and the 'Loch' may refer to Lambroughton Loch which could have reached as far as this site. as stated, Buiston Loch is situated some distance to the south-east. In 1677 a reference is made to "Andrew Arnot in Lochsyd of Lochrig". The Lochridge Burn once contributed to the waters of Lambroughton Loch and nowadays has a confluence with the Garrier Burn near Wheatrig Farm.

Robert Burnes, the poet's uncle, lived at Titwood near Kilmaurs for several years and worked in the lime quarries at Lochridge until he was crippled with arthritis or rheumatism and moved to Stewarton.

In 1820 only six people were qualified to vote as freeholders in Stewarton Parish, being proprietors of Lochridge (Stewart), Robertland (Hunter Blair), Kirkhill (Col.J.S.Barns), Kennox (McAlester), Lainshaw (Cunninghame), and Corsehill (Montgomery Cunninghame). Dunlop had only two people qualified to vote by right as freeholders.

The Draffen Stone used to be located in a field near the house of the same name. Due to a housing development it has been moved to a site in front of Draffen House. It is not known whether this stone is merely a 'rubbing stone' for cattle or a menhir. It is not recorded by Historic Scotland.

In February 2009 the Lochrig or Lochridge Burn was severely polluted with diesel oil spilled from a train derailed at the railway bridge near Peacockbank farm. Mitigation measures were put in place, however pollution eventually reached the River Irvine.

== See also ==
- Barony of Peacockbank
- Chapeltoun
- Lambroughton
- Corsehill
- A Researcher's Guide to Local History terminology

== Sources ==
1. Boyle, Andrew M. (1996), The Ayrshire book of Burns-lore. Darvel : Alloway Publishing. ISBN 0-907526-71-3.
2. Corshill Baron-Court Book. Arch. Hist. Coll. Ayr & Wigton. V.IV. MDCCCLXXXIV.
3. Davis, Michael C. (1991). The Castles and Mansions of Ayrshire. Ardrishaig : Spindrift Press
4. Dobie, James D. (ed Dobie, J.S.) (1876). Cunninghame, Topographized by Timothy Pont 1604–1608, with continuations and illustrative notices. Pub. John Tweed, Glasgow.
5. METRO. January 28, 2009.
6. Urquhart, Robert H. et al. (1998). The Hearth Tax for Ayrshire 1691. Ayrshire Records Series V.1. Ayr : Ayr Fed Hist Soc ISBN 0-9532055-0-9.
7. Young, Alex F. (2017). The Country Houses, Castles and Mansions of East Ayrshire. Catrine : Stenlake. ISBN 9781840336306.
