= Lambroughton Loch =

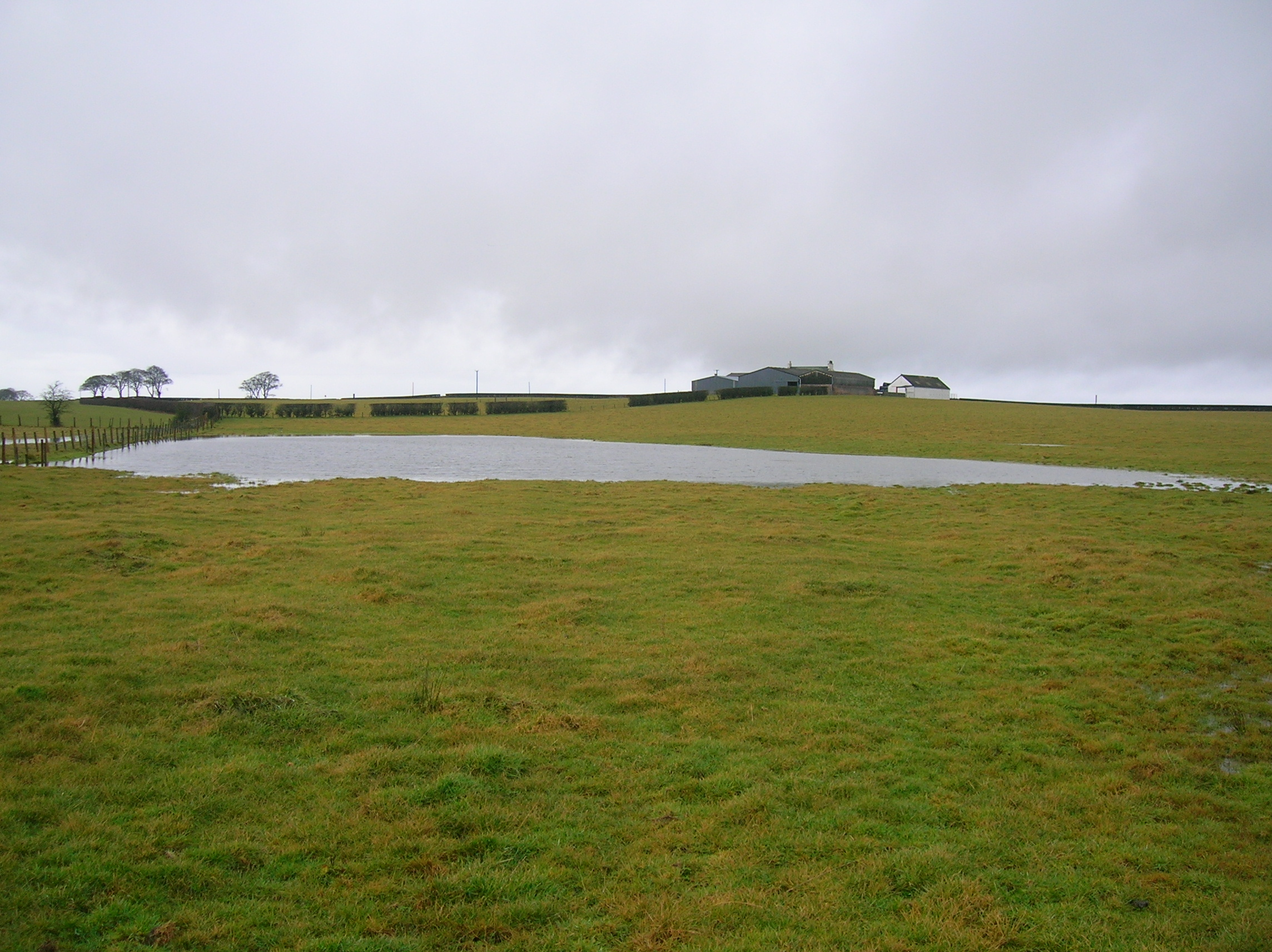
- Site of Lambroughton Loch below West Lambroughton Farm

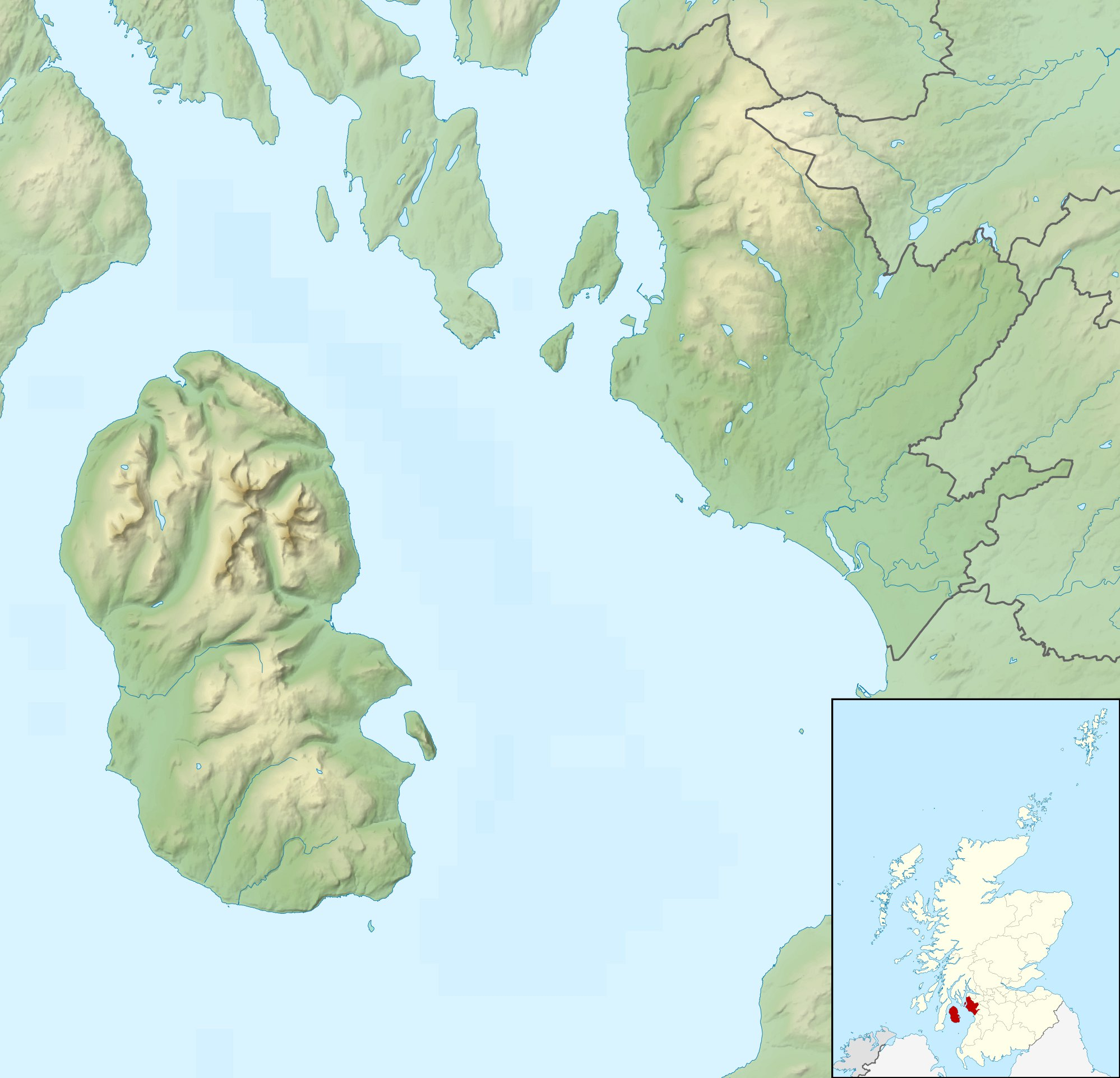
- Location within North Ayrshire
- Location: North Ayrshire, Scotland
- Coordinates: 55°39′8.1″N 4°33′8.0″W
- Type: Drained freshwater loch
- Primary inflows: Lochridge Burn
- Primary outflows: Garrier Water
- Basin countries: Scotland
- Settlements: Kilmaurs

Lambroughton Loch or Wheatrig Loch was situated in a low-lying area between the farms and dwellings of Hillhead, Lambroughton, Wheatrig, Titwood and Lochridge mainly in the Parish of Dreghorn, North Ayrshire. The loch was mainly fed by the Lochridge (previously Lochrig) Burn, the Garrier Burn and surface runoff, such as from the old rig and furrows indicated by Roy's maps of the mid-18th century. The loch outflow was via the Lochridge Burn that runs into the Garrier Burn, passes the site of the old Lochend habitation and into the Bracken Burn near Little Alton. The rivulet or watercourse is known as the Garrier Burn beyond this point.

== History ==
Map showing the Garrier and Lochrdige Burns

Lambroughton Loch, apparently mostly drained before the 1700s, was fed by the Lochridge and Garrier Burn and its outflow formed a confluence with the Bracken Burn and is then known as the Garrier Burn that runs into the River Irvine near Gatehead. The loch was mostly located on the lands of Lambroughton, Hillhead, and Wheatrig. The 'cut' through the natural dam ridge that once held back the loch waters below Hillhead and Wheatrig lay near the old dwelling of Lochend. Indications at Lochend suggest that an artificial dam also existed. Successive Ordnance Survey maps have perpetuated an error in the naming of the Garrier Burn which has been confused with the Bracken Burn as shown by McNaught's map of the parish. Flooding during the winter remains substantial and curling took place here in the 19th century.

The nearby placenames of Lochend, Cranshaw (Wood of the Cranes or Herons), Langmuir and Lochridge are self-evident as indicators of the nature of the area and the one time existence of the loch. A bog is marked as existing below Mid Lambroughton in 1788-91.

Blaeu's map of 1654 places a 'Lambrochmill' in this area and a 'Crunshaw Mill' is also recorded. The loch's drainage may relate to the abolition of thirlage in 1779 resulting in the need for 'heads of water' to power a number of smaller mills become unnecessary and the lochs were reclaimed as farming land; this fate for example was met by Millburn Mill that was powered by the waters of Lochlea.

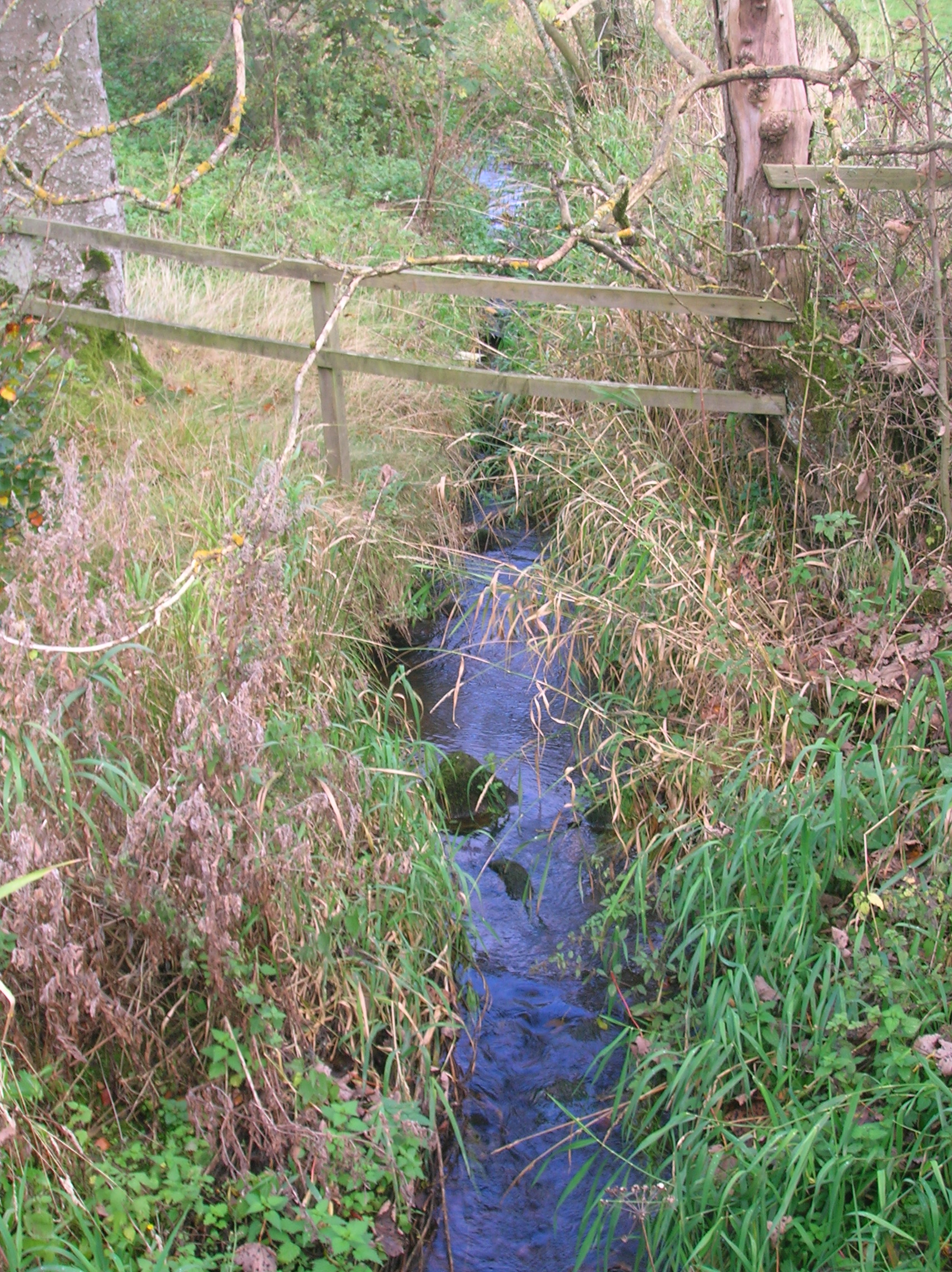
The Garrier Burn at Titwood

A track ran from Wheatrig (previously Whatrig, Whiterig in 1775, Whiteriggs in 1832 and Whyrigg in 1654) Farm across the Garrier Burn to Hillhead Farm. A Cranshaw habitation is marked in 1832 and 1821, but not marked in 1775. A cran in Scots was a "crane" or "heron" and the 'shaw' or small wood; a copse is still present. Cranes or herons are still a common sight and in the past they may have nested in the wood on the nearby lands of Hillhead, hence the name. Cranshaw was a building located near Little Alton on the northern side of the lane, and on the east side of the Garrier Burn as clearly indicated in the Montgomerie Estate plans of 1788 - 91.

Lochend is associated with two small fields on the 1860 OS, although it is not marked on earlier or later maps. It is however mentioned, together with 'Crumshaw Mill' in papers of 1618 relating to the Glencairn estates. A Lambroch Mill is shown in this general area on Blaeu's map of 1654, the survey dating however from the early 1600s. The old bridge at Alton with its proximity to the 'Old Toun', may have been the Lambroch Bridge marked on Blaeu's 1654 map.

=== Drainage ===
The loch's drainage may have begun in the early 18th century when Alexander Montgomerie, 10th Earl of Eglinton, was pursuing a number of agricultural improvements on his extensive estates. Further drainage work may have taken place in the 1740s as part of the improvements undertaken to provide employment for Montgomerie Irish estate workers during the Irish potato famines of the 1740s and the mid-19th century. Many drainage schemes also date to the end of World War I when many soldiers returned en masse to civilian life.

=== Ownership ===
King Robert the Bruce gave the lands of Lambroughton to Sir Robert Cuninghame of Kilmaurs in 1320. In 1675, Sir John Cunninghame Bart., conveyed to Robert Cunningham, druggist / apothecary, Edinburgh, the lands of 'Auldtoun, Langmuir, Langsyde and Lambrochtoune in whose family they seem to have remained until 1820, when George Cunninghame was the owner. These lands were part of the Eglinton Estate from 1520 when they were obtained by Hugh, the first Earl of Eglinton until the late 20th century.

=== Etymology ===
Previous location of the Loch of Lambroughton, Ayrshire

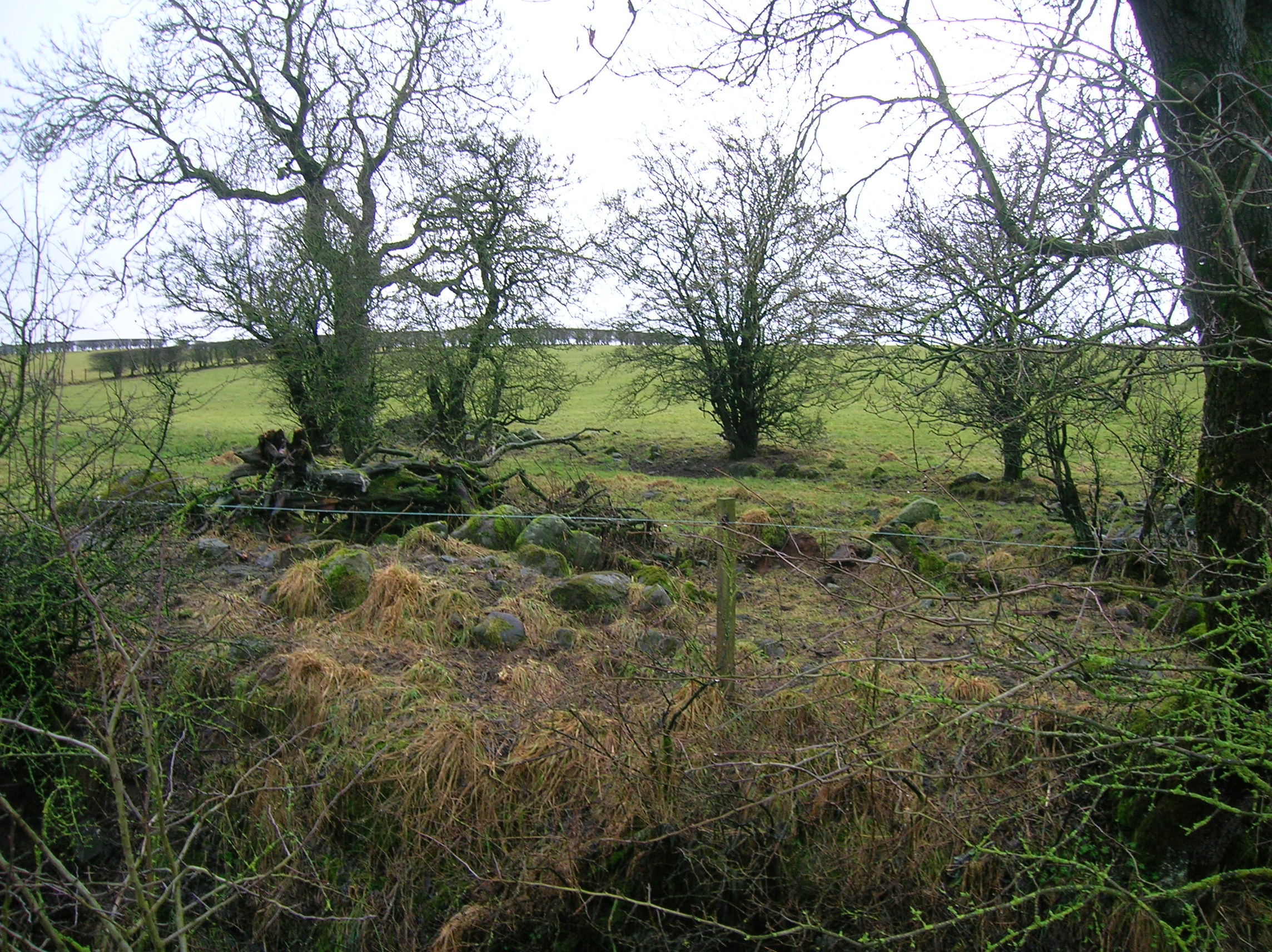
The site of the Cranshaw / Lochend Cottage or mill

The Garrier's name is thought to be derived, according to McNaught, from the Gaelic 'ruigh or righ' meaning 'fast running water' The Scots word 'Gaw' is also the term given to a 'cut made by a plough' or a furrow or channel made to draw off water.

The Garrier burn is now seasonal as its headwaters are the drained Buiston Loch, pronounced 'Biston', (previously Buston). The Garrier is still pronounced locally as 'Gawreer'.

== Habitats ==
The site is now represented by a low, marshy area centred at NS 358 543 on the OS map. The Ordnance Survey maps of the mid-19th century indicate that the area was farming land devoid of marsh, bog, or wetland, however the area in 2010 is as stated above. The loch site is located away from significant human disturbance and is a favoured site for resting and feeding by migrating birds such as Canada geese, greylag and pink-footed geese.

== Micro-history ==
The Royal Caledonian Curling Club records that a curling match took place on Wheatrig Loch on 11 December 1856.

On 27 January 2009, a BP tanker train carrying liquid fuels (diesel and heating oil) from Mossend to Riccarton was derailed near the bridge over the Stewarton to Kilmaurs road at Peacockbank Farm. Several wagons subsequently caught fire. The Lochridge Burn was badly polluted and extensive pollution reparation works were carried out; the Garrier Burn escaped major contamination.

== See also ==
- Lambroughton
