= Alexander Stewart (archbishop of St Andrews) =

Archbishop of St Andrews born1491

- Archbishop of St Andrews
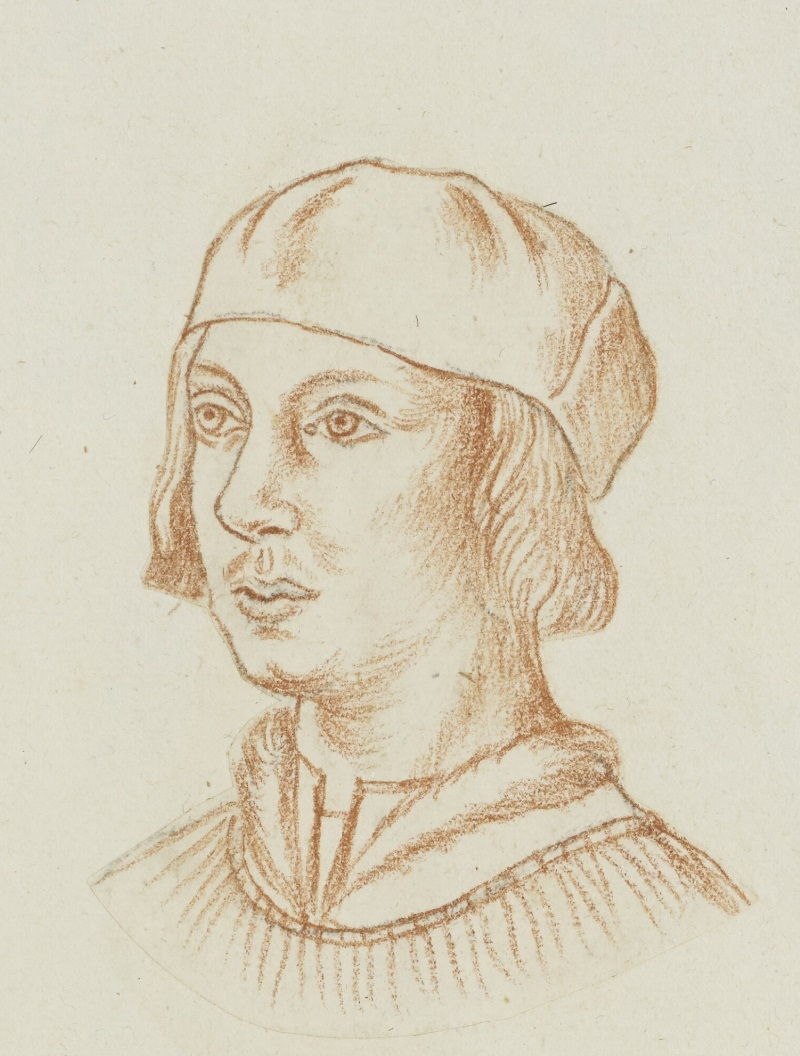
- Stewart, Alexander (Recueil d'Arras, f. 256)
- Church: Roman Catholic Church
- Archdiocese: St Andrews
- Appointed: 10 May 1504
- Term ended: 9 September 1513
- Predecessor: James Stewart
- Successor: Andrew Forman

Personal details
- Born: c. 1493
- Died: 9 September 1513 (aged c. 20) Branxton, Northumberland, England
- Parents: James IV of Scotland; Marion Boyd

Alexander Stewart (c. 1491– 9 September 1513) was an illegitimate son of King James IV of Scotland by his mistress Marion Boyd. He was the King's eldest illegitimate child. He was an elder brother of Catherine Stewart, his only full sibling, and was an older half-brother of the future James V. He was installed as Archbishop of St Andrews at the age of eleven and was killed beside his father the King at the Battle of Flodden aged twenty.

== Family ==
Alexander Stewart's mother was Marion Boyd, daughter of Archibald Boyd of Bonshaw, whose sister Elizabeth Boyd was married to Archibald Douglas, 5th Earl of Angus. Douglas, who served as Lord Chancellor of Scotland between 1493 and 1498, encouraged the relationship between his niece Marion and the young King James IV. James's children by Marion Boyd were Alexander, born c. 1493, and Catherine Stewart. Catherine (d. after 1554) married James Douglas, 3rd Earl of Morton (d. 1548).

Alexander became a close friend of James IV's queen consort Margaret Tudor, often included at her table playing cards in the early days of her marriage, before his departure for Europe.

== Church life ==
From a young age Alexander was groomed for a life in the church. At the age of four his father received a dispensation from illegitimacy by Pope Julius II enabling him to join the church. By September 1502 he was archdeacon, when his uncle James, Duke of Ross died in 1504 his father the King nominated him as the new Archbishop of St Andrews. Alexander was still only a boy at age 11 which would mean his father could still receive the revenues of St Andrews since Alexander was under age until he turned 27.

== Education and Erasmus ==
He received a superb education firstly from James Watson, later Dean of the Arts faculty at St Andrews, and latterly from Patrick Paniter whom he seemed to have been close to. In 1507 Alexander Stewart was sent to France on the royal ship the Treasurer. His education continued with lengthy journeys to the Low Countries, and Italy in 1507. In Padua he studied rhetoric and Greek under Erasmus who wrote a moving obituary after young Alexander's death at the Battle of Flodden. Erasmus mentioned their time at Siena where after studies in the morning Alexander would play the monochord, recorder or lute in the afternoon. Alexander returned to Scotland in 1510 and at the age of 17 became Lord Chancellor of Scotland.

== Later life ==
Alexander was reportedly severely myopic, possibly from extensive study in poor conditions. In 1511 he co-founded St Leonard's College in St Andrews, whose chapel still stands (minus its original tower). A gateway with his coat of arms above the arch survives in St Andrews. He was killed along with his father at the Battle of Flodden in Northumberland in 1513.

== Ancestors ==
Ancestors of Alexander Stewart (archbishop of St Andrews)

8. James II of Scotland
4. James III of Scotland
9. Mary of Guelders
2. James IV of Scotland
10. Christian I of Denmark
5. Margaret of Denmark
11. Dorothea of Brandenburg
1. Alexander Stewart (archbishop of St Andrews)
12. Robert Boyd, 1st Lord Boyd
6. Archibald Boyd
13. Mariot Maxwell
3. Marion Boyd
14. Archibald Mure
7. Christian Mure
15. Isabella Montgomery

== Arms ==
Coat of arms of Alexander Stewart
Notes Stewart was the natural son of James IV of Scotland and bore the royal arms with the addition of an ecclesiastical cross Escutcheon Or, a lion rampant Gules armed and langued Azure within a double tressure flory-counter-flory of the second.

Religious titles
Preceded by James Stewart	Archbishop of St. Andrews; 1504–1513	Succeeded by Andrew Forman
Political offices
Vacant Title last held by James Stewart	Lord Chancellor of Scotland; 1510–1513	Succeeded by James Beaton
