= Marion Boyd (mistress) =

15th c courtier and mistress to King James IV of Scotland

Marion Boyd (fl. late 15th century) of Bonshaw, also known as Margot or Margaret, was a mistress of King James IV of Scotland, and his first important mistress.

She was the daughter of Archibald of Nariston and Bonshaw (dead before May 1507), and his wife Christian Mure (still living on 28 January 1523). She had two brothers, Robert of Bonshaw and Patrick. She had also a sister, whose name is not known, married, first, to Hugh Mure of Polkellie, and, secondly, to Archibald Craufurd of Craufurdland, and another sister, Elizabeth, married to Thomas Douglas, younger of Lochleven.

Marion and James IV had two children who reached adulthood: Alexander, Archbishop of St Andrew, born about 1490, and Catherine, who married James Douglas, 3rd Earl of Morton.

Marion also had an illegitimate son with James Hamilton, 1st Earl of Arran. Their son James Hamilton of Finnart was born illegitimate about 1495 but was later legitimated in 1512. Her three granddaughters were mentally ill and declared legally incompetent.

She was related to Thomas Boyd, Earl of Arran, and a niece of Elizabeth Boyd, the second wife of Archibald Douglas, 5th Earl of Angus. Her relationship with the king was linked with the rise and fall of Angus's influence at the court.

== Genealogical table ==
Marion Boyd's relatives (selective chart)

Robert Boyd; 1st Lord Boyd d. c. 1482	Mariot Maxwell	James II of Scotland; 1430 – 1460	Mary of Guelders c. 1435–1463
Alexander Boyd; 3rd Lord Boyd d. a. 1508	Christian Mure	Archibald Boyd of Nariston and Bonshaw	Thomas Boyd; Earl of Arran d. c. 1474	Mary Stewart; Countess of Arran; 1453 – 1488	James Hamilton; 1st Lord Hamilton c. 1415 – 1479
John Mure of Rowallan d. 1513	Marion Boyd d. 1559	James IV of Scotland; 1473 – 1513	James Hamilton; 1st Earl of Arran. 1475 – 1529	Janet Bethune c. 1490 c. 1522
Mungo Mure of Rowallan c. 1500-1547	Alexander Stewart archbishop of St Andrews c. 1493-1513	Catherine Stewart; Countess of Morton d. after 1554	James Douglas; 3rd Earl of Morton d. 1548	James Hamilton of Finnart c. 1495 – 1540
James Douglas; Regent Morton; Earl of Morton c. 1516 – 1581	Elizabeth Douglas	Beatrix Douglas	Margaret Douglas; Countess of Arran d. 1579	James Hamilton; Regent Arran; Duke of Châtellerault c. 1519 – 1575
