= Barony of Peacockbank =

Former barony of Scotland

Coordinates: 55.671°N 4.512°W

The Barony of Peacockbank was in the old feudal Baillerie of Cunninghame, near Stewarton in what is now East Ayrshire, Scotland.

== The history of Peacockbank ==
Dobie records that this Barony, called of old the 'Barony of Balgray' was given by the Earl of Eglinton to Sir Neil Montgomerie in 1616. These lands included Fullwoods, Gabroch-Hills, Auchentibers, etc. It was transferred by 'Clare Constat' which was an instrument by which legal ownership of land is transferred. It is a deed executed by a subject-superior for the purpose of completing the title as his vassal's heir to the lands held by the deceased vassal. Papers in the National Archives of Scotland of 1654 refer to the Barony of Peacockbank and the properties of Over and Nether Peacockbank, together with the corn mill, toun, etc.

In 1691 the Hearth Tax records show that Robert Catherwood lived in Peacockbank and had tenants: Mathew Longmure, Andrew Catherwood and William Walker.

In 1820 John Deans is the proprietor of Peacock-bank, which had a rental value of £127 13s. 4d. and is given as being "remarkably well cultivated". James Dunlop gave the Barony of Peacockbank to his son Alexander upon his marriage in 1667.

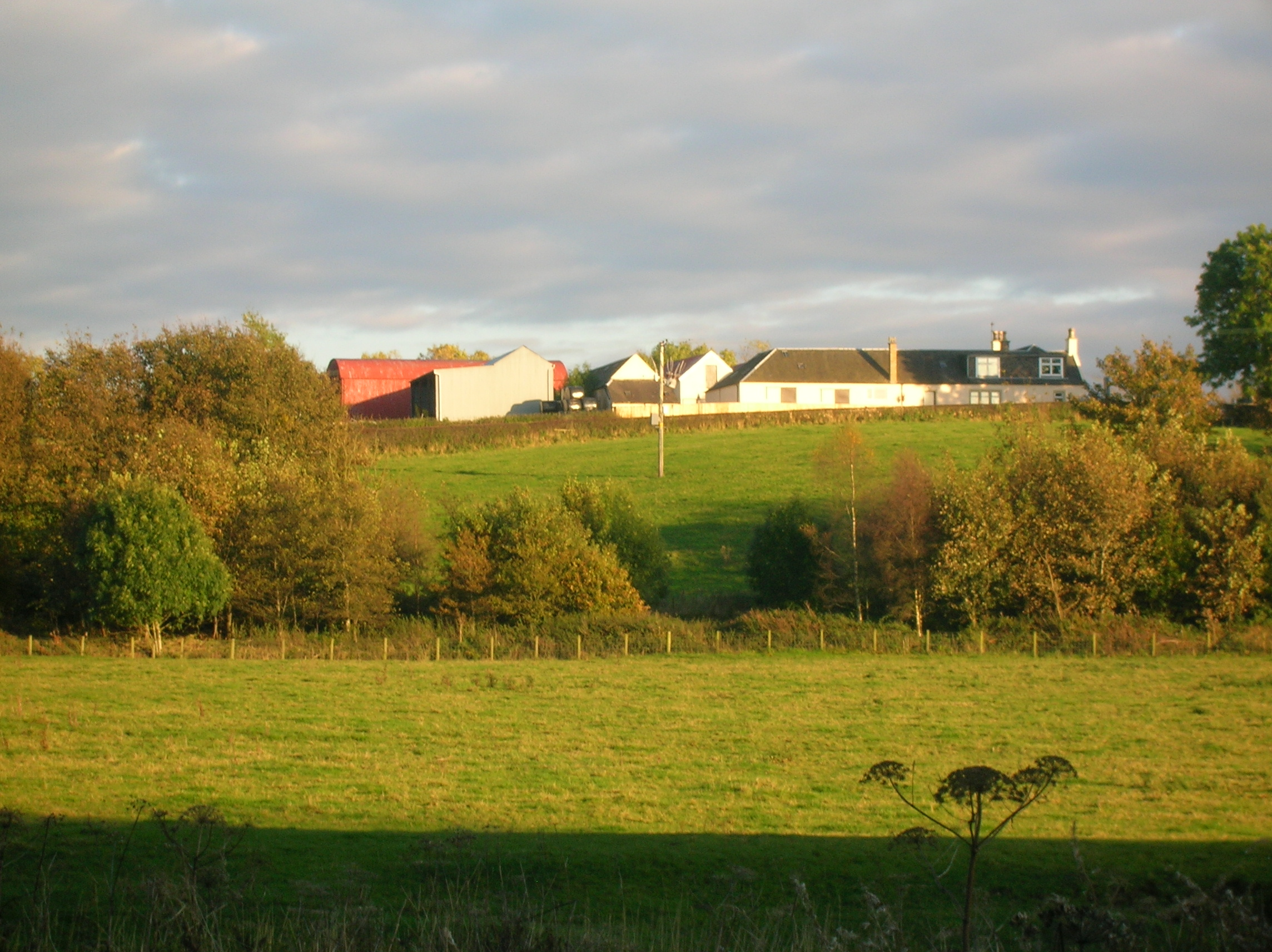
Peacockbank farm.

Peacockbank Farm has seen many changes, with the coming of the railway came the impressive viaduct and the new road to Kilmaurs and Kilmarnock was built very close to it. The course of the old entrance drive to Lochridge House was changed by the railway company and the original drive ran down past the old Tollhouse, on the site of the 'roads department' sand & salt store, to join the Irvine to Stewarton road has gone completely, apart possibly from the position of the gate. The field above was called 'Kiln Field', but no remains of any kiln exist. The field bisected by the railway at the viaduct was known as 'Bonfire Field' and may have been used for Beltane fires, etc. Fore Croft Park ran up to Peacockbank from near the old mill. The field above Peter's Brae was called Rye Hill Park.

== The murder of the 4th Earl of Eglinton ==
In April 1586, Hugh, 4th. Earl of Eglinton was travelling to Stirling to join the court having been commanded to attend by the King, accompanied only by a few domestic servants. He stopped at Lainshaw Castle to dine with his close relative, a Montgomerie who was Lord of Lainshaw and whose Lady was a Margaret Cunninghame of Aiket Castle, with sisters were married to John Cunninghame of Corsehill and David Cunninghame of Robertland. It seems that a plot to kill the Earl as an act of revenge had been organised by Lady Montgomerie.

After the murder Lady Margaret Montgomerie was said to have fled to Ireland, however it seems that she actually remained close by, living with an estate tenant, one Robert Barr and family at Pearce Bank farm, now High Peacockbank. She was eventually permitted to return to her husband and home, however she never again left the grounds of Lainshaw Castle and she avoided any contact with the Montgomerie family for the remainder of her days.

== See also ==
- Cunninghamhead
- Chapeltoun
- Lambroughton
- Corsehill
- The Lands of Lochridge
