= Buiston Loch =

Ephemeral lake in Ayrshire, Scotland

Coordinates: 55°39′32.4″N 4°31′12.3″W

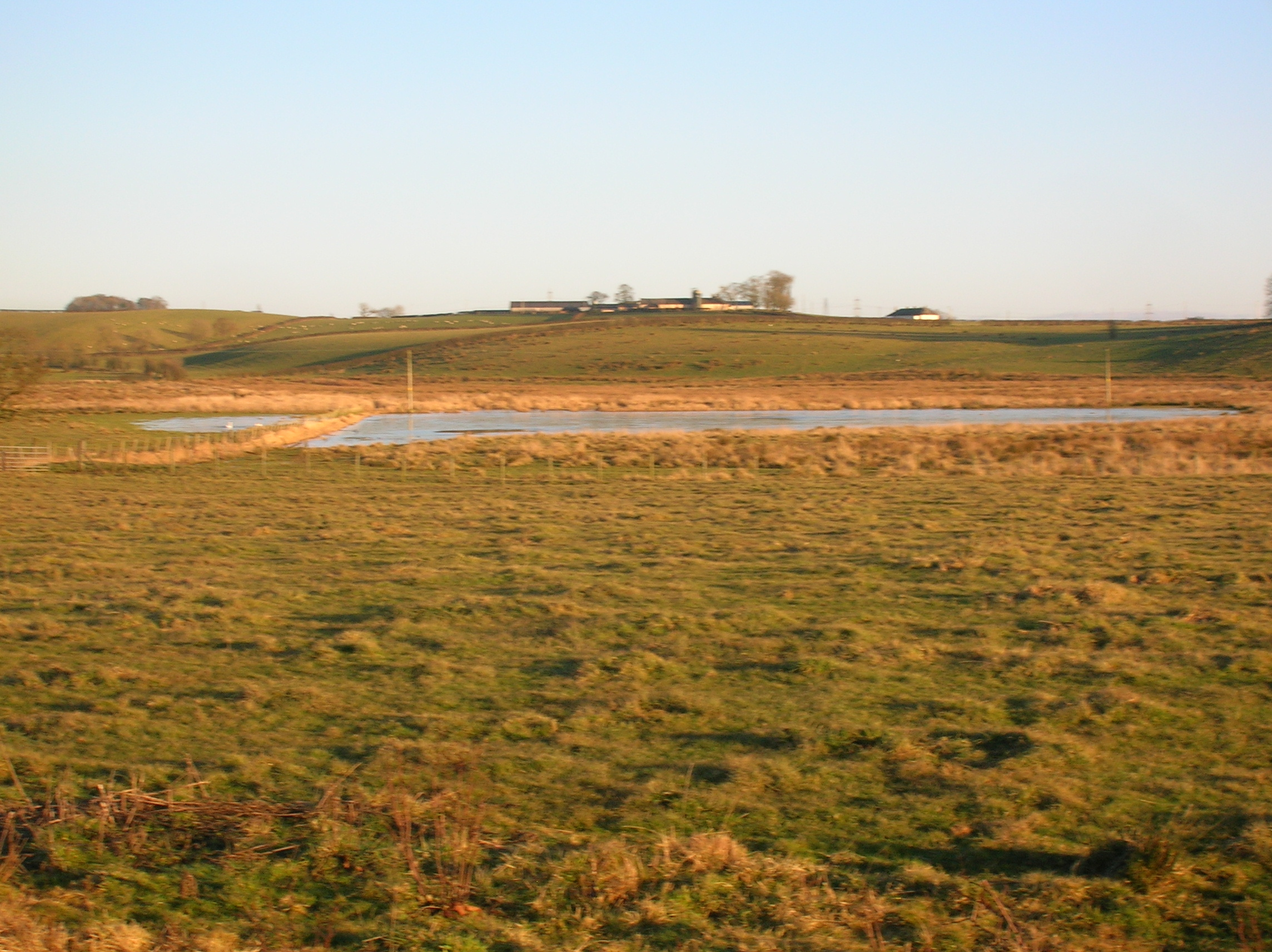
- Buiston Loch from near Lochside Farm

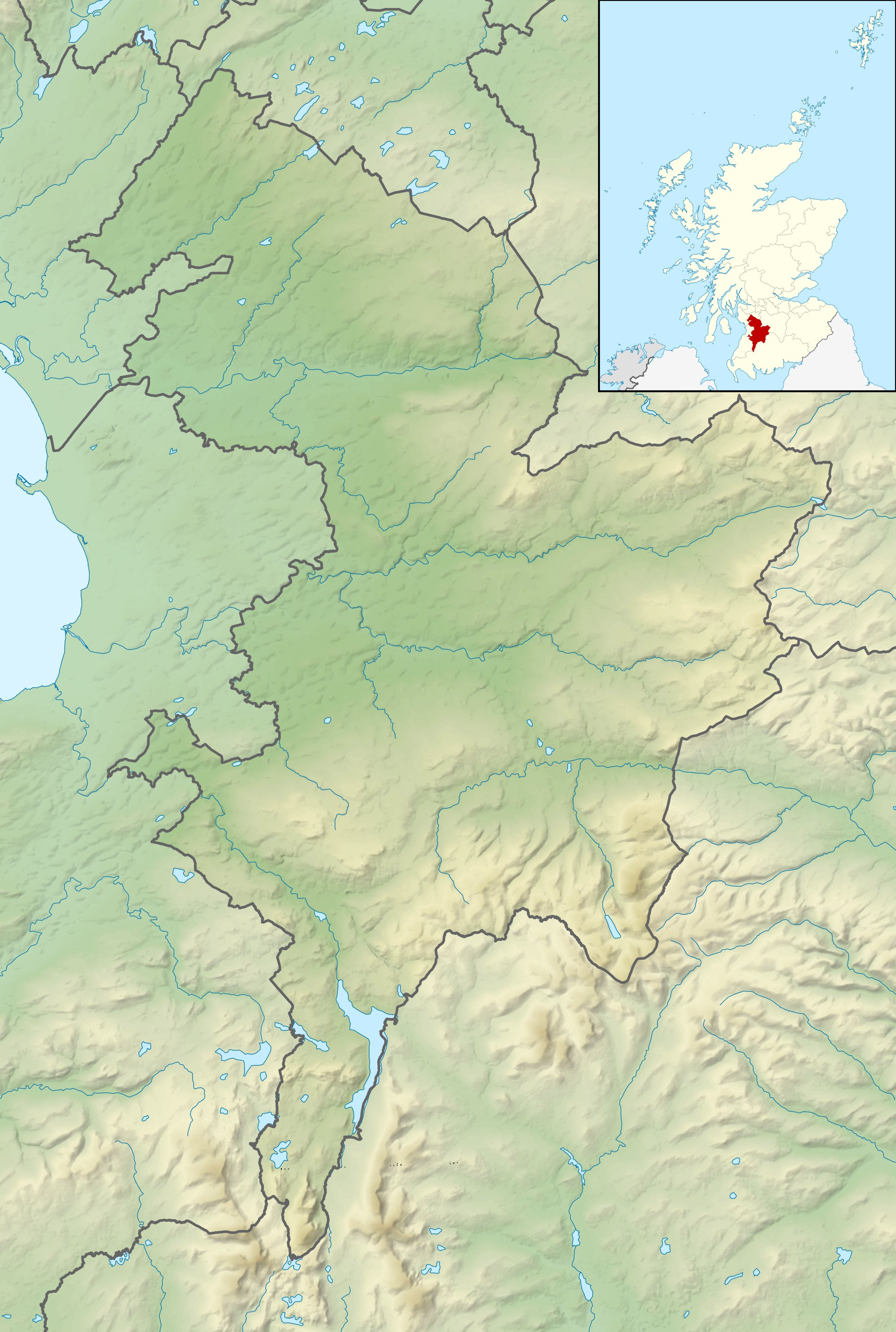
- Location within East Ayrshire
- Location: Kilmaurs and Stewarton, East Ayrshire, Scotland
- Type: Drained freshwater loch
- Primary inflows: Rainfall and runoff
- Primary outflows: Garrier Burn
- Catchment area: 800 by 1,700 m (2,600 by 5,600 ft)
- Basin countries: Scotland
- Max. length: 750 m (2,460 ft)
- Max. width: 250 m (820 ft)
- Surface area: 0.1475 km^{2} (0.0570 sq mi)
- Max. depth: 6 m (20 ft)
- Surface elevation: 90 m (300 ft)
- Islands: One Crannog
- Settlements: Stewarton

Buiston Loch (NS 416 433) (locally pronounced /ˈbɪstən/ BIST-ən), also known as Buston, Biston and Mid Buiston, was situated in the mid-Ayrshire clayland at an altitude of 90 m OD. The loch was natural, sitting in a hollow created by glaciation. The loch waters drained via the Garrier Burn that joins the Bracken and Lochridge Burns before joining the River Irvine.

It has been drained since the early 18th century, and is now only visible as an often flooded surface depression in pastureland situated in a low-lying area close to the A735 road between the farms and dwellings of Lochside, Buistonend and Mid-Buiston in the Parishes of Kilmaurs and Stewarton, East Ayrshire, Scotland.

It is well documented through the presence of a 2000 year old crannog, first excavated 1880-1 and then documented by Dr. Duncan McNaught, the Kilmaurs parochial schoolmaster. Dr R. Munro and others.

== History ==
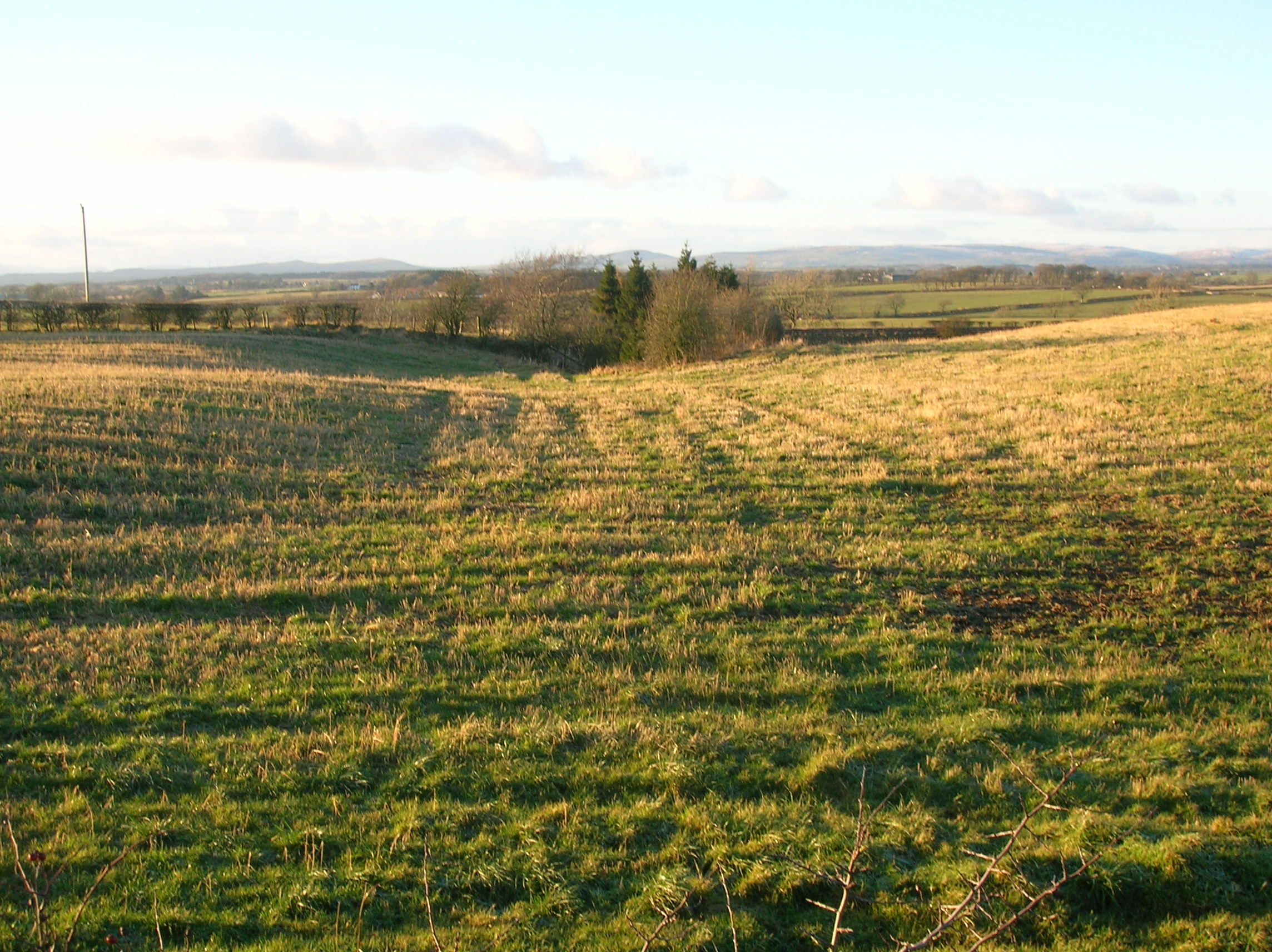
The site of the old Garrier Burn outflow

Blaeu's map of 1654, based on Timothy Pont's work of the late 16th century, shows a substantial triangular-shaped loch recorded as 'Buston L', however by the mid-eighteenth century the loch appears to have been drained. The Garrier Burn is marked on Thomson's map of 1828, however it has been canalised and field drains added by the time of the first Ordnance Survey of the mid 19th century, presumably as part of an improved drainage system. Around 1830 the loch was described by a Mr Hay as being a mossy bog in the summer and a sheet of water throughout the winter and by 1880 a richly cultivated meadow. The site had been further drained around the year 1875.

Buiston was a post-glacial loch, on the lands of the farm known as Mid-Buiston, for many years the property of the Earls of Eglinton, and was at first believed to be a structure built by the Earls of Eglinton to house a shelter for shooting waterfowl. Evidence of the original shoreline persists on the northern side of the loch basin.

The early Ordnance Survey maps and written descriptions show the site as fully drained and under cultivation, however drainage is now inadequate (2011) and the area is becoming re-established as a seasonal loch.

=== Drainage ===
The loch's drainage may have begun in the early 18th century when Alexander Montgomerie, 10th Earl of Eglinton, was pursuing a number of agricultural improvements on his extensive estates. Further drainage work may have taken place in the 1740s as part of the improvements undertaken to provide employment for Montgomerie Irish estate workers during the Irish potato famines of the 1740s and the mid 19th centuries. Many drainage schemes also date to the end of World War I when many soldiers returned en masse to civilian life.

=== The Crannog ===
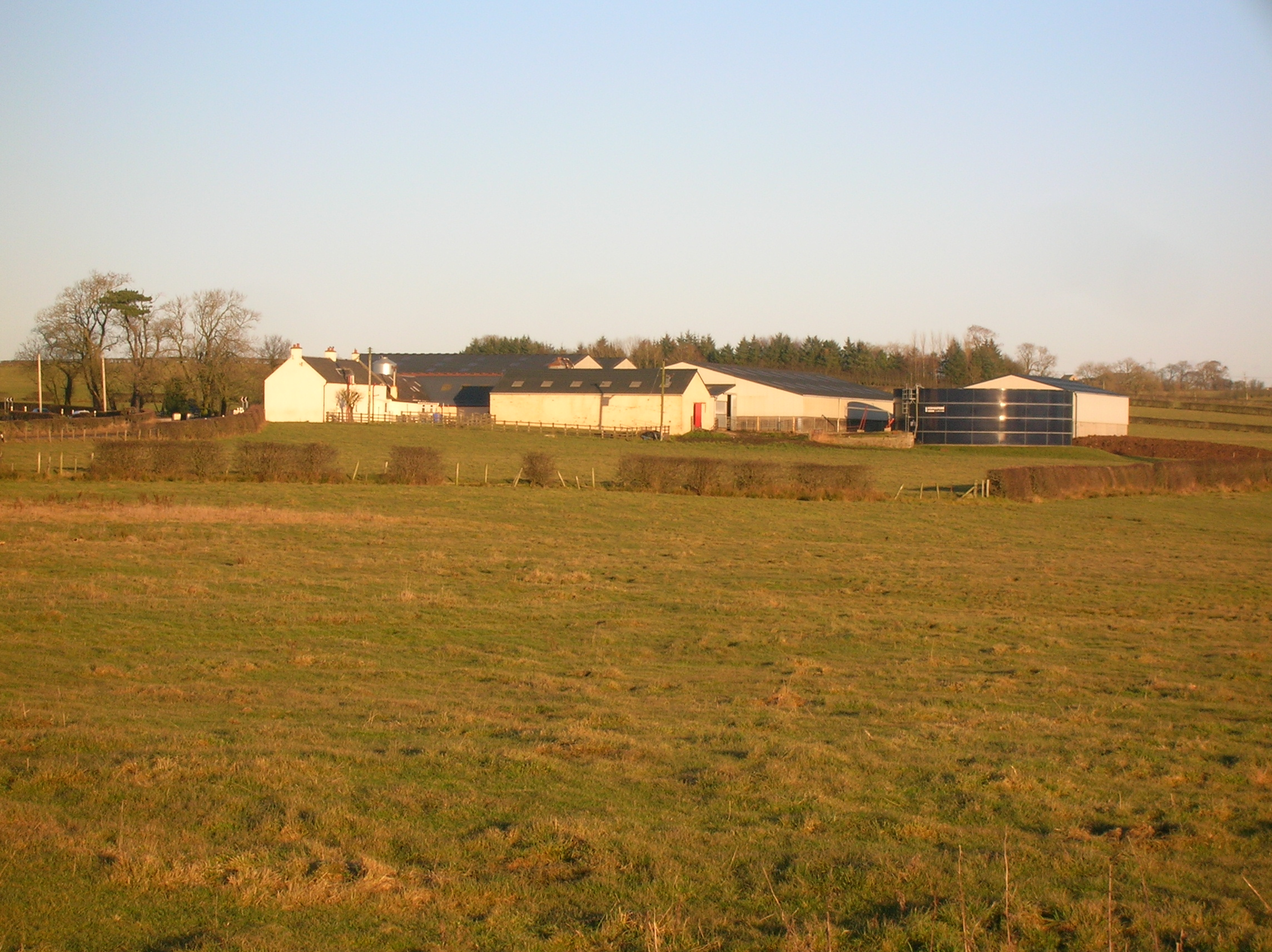
Lochside Farm

The roughly circular crannog, known as the 'Swan Knowe', lay around 70 m from the northern shore and was identified in December 1880 from 'worked' timbers located within the drainage 'gote' or ditch on the site by a teacher from Kilmaurs, Duncan McNaught, who was familiar with the Lochlea crannog site. The site was first excavated in 1880 and more thoroughly in April 1881. In 1989-90 the site was re-excavated as part of an investigation into the condition of crannogs in south-west Scotland commissioned by Historic Scotland to establish the extent of loss and decay on crannog sites. Finds included a rare fourth century hanging bowl, a dugout canoe, and two ovens.

The crannog had four periods of occupation, dating from AD1 to AD 525, that is from before the Roman conquest of this area, through the period of the Damnonian tribe's rule, and into the time of the brythonic Kingdom of Strathclyde. Three log boats or canoes seem to have been found, the one in 1989-90 was left on site, another was lost in a fire at the Dick Institute in 1909 and the third may survive in the Hunterian Museum in the form of an unprovenanced specimen from the 1881 dig.

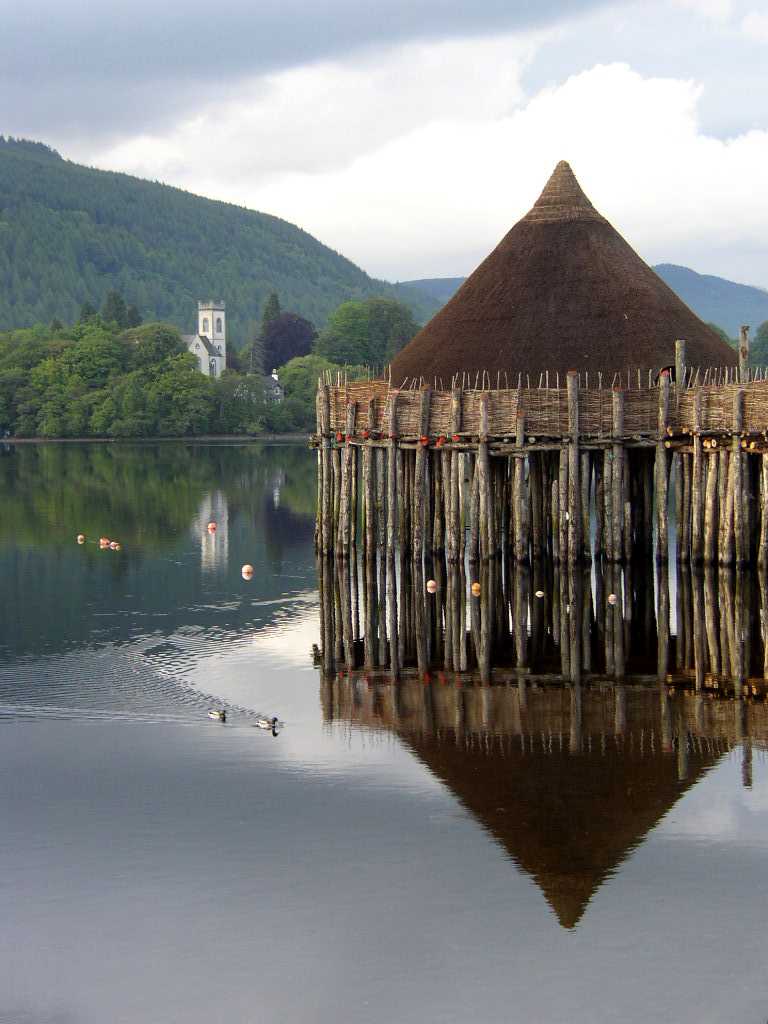
A reconstruction of a crannog in Loch Tay

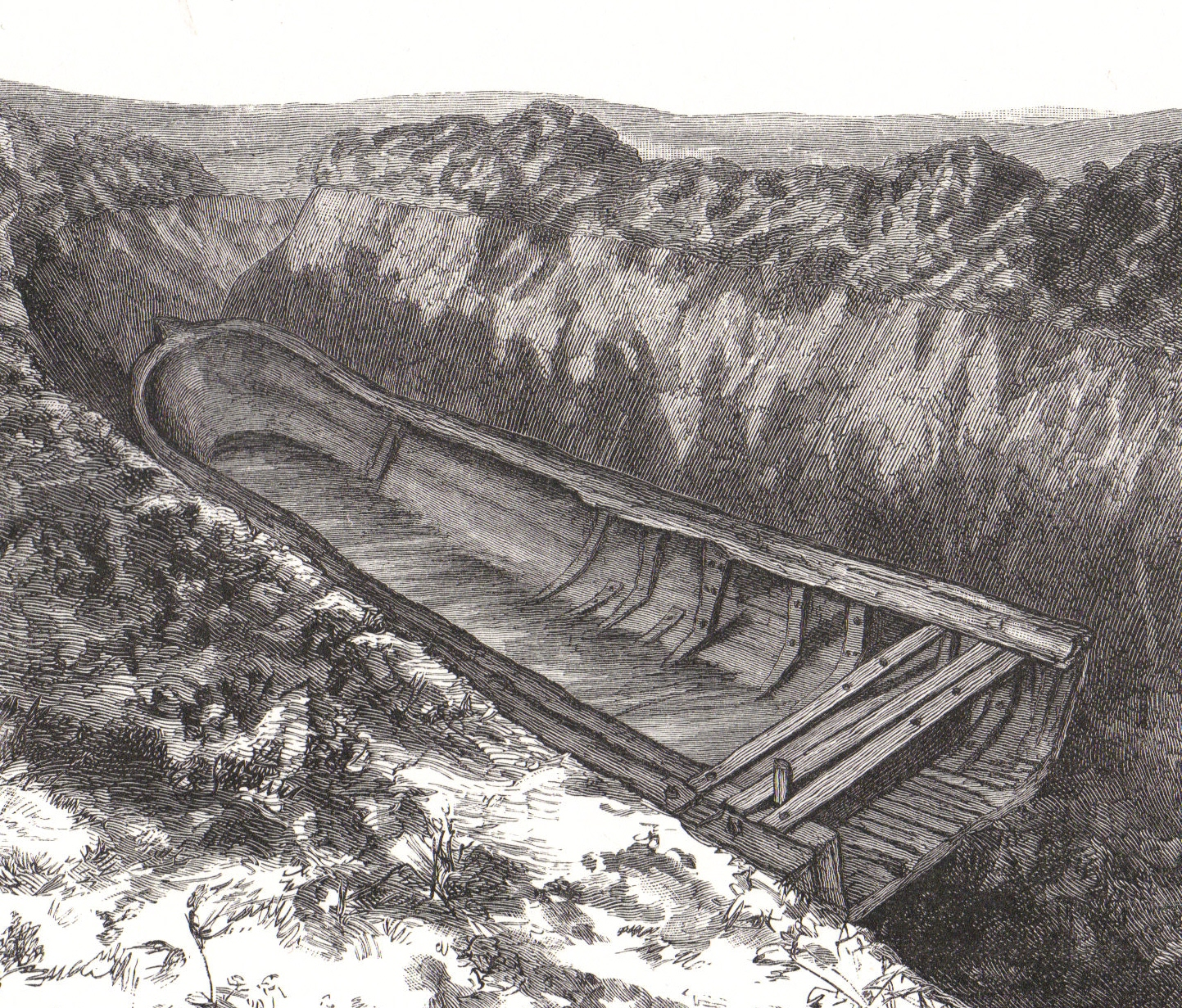
A Buiston Loch canoe

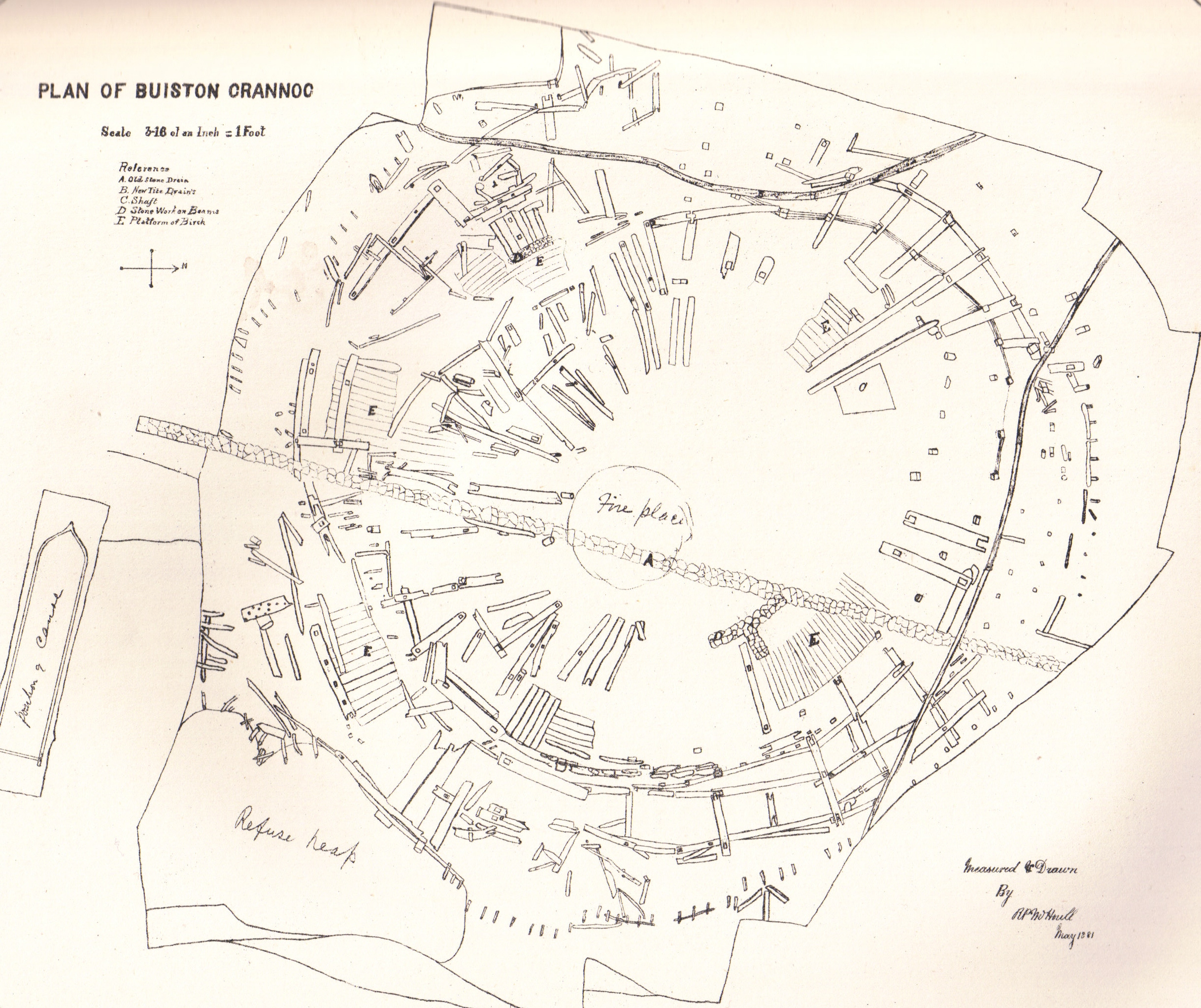
Plan of Buiston Loch

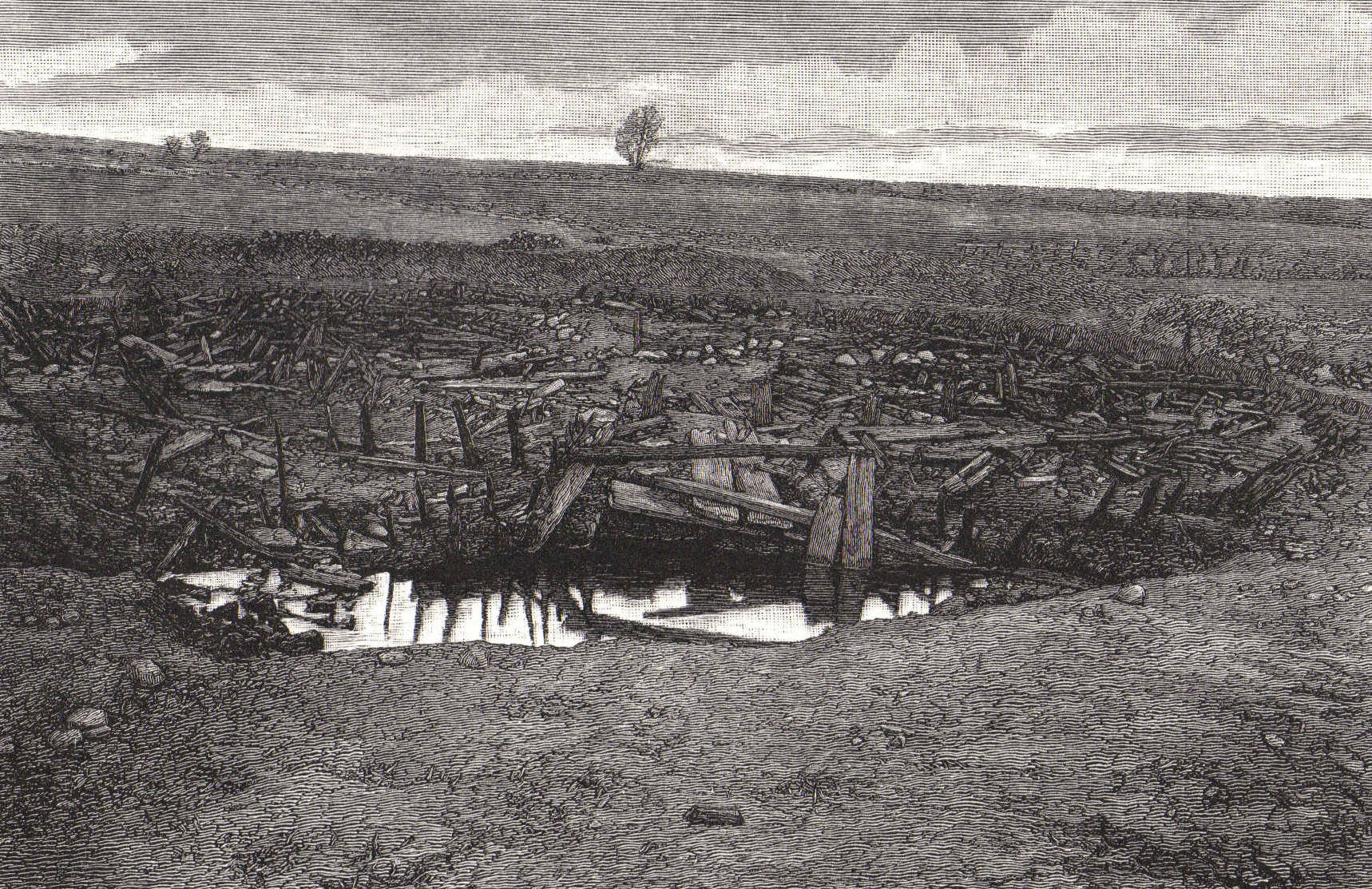
View of the crannog excavations

Much timber (thirteen cartloads) had been taken away prior to the crannog's identification and a local farmer is recorded as having remarked There maun hae been dwallers here at ae time. It was constructed from successive layers of turves, stones, intermingled within branches and tree trunks. No gangway was found leading to the crannog, which may have had a single large circular dwelling located on it.

Previous location of Lochlea, South Ayrshire
