= Soulis Cross =

Ancient Scottish cross

Coordinates: 55°27′25.9″N 4°36′10.3″W

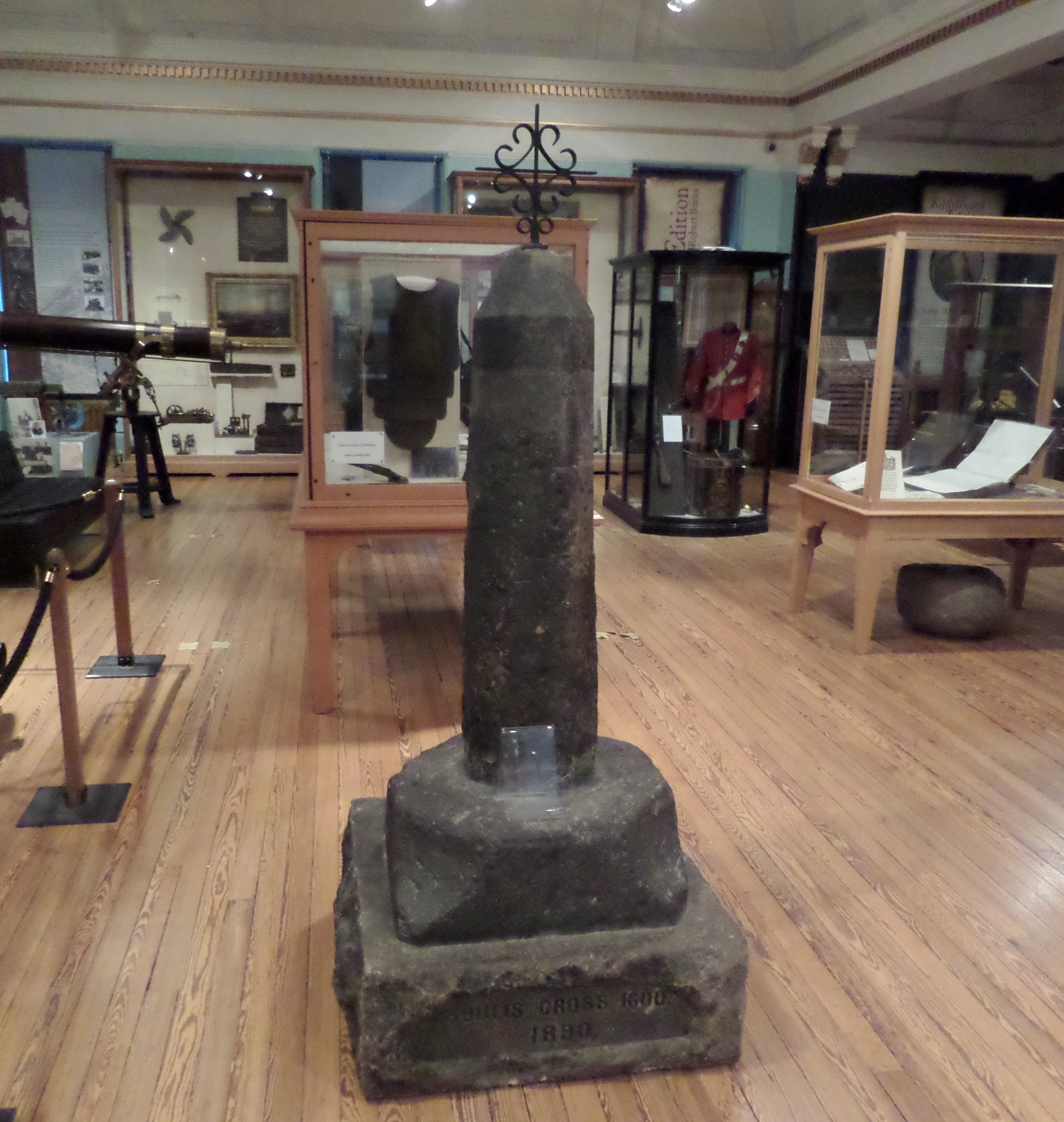
The original Soulis Cross.

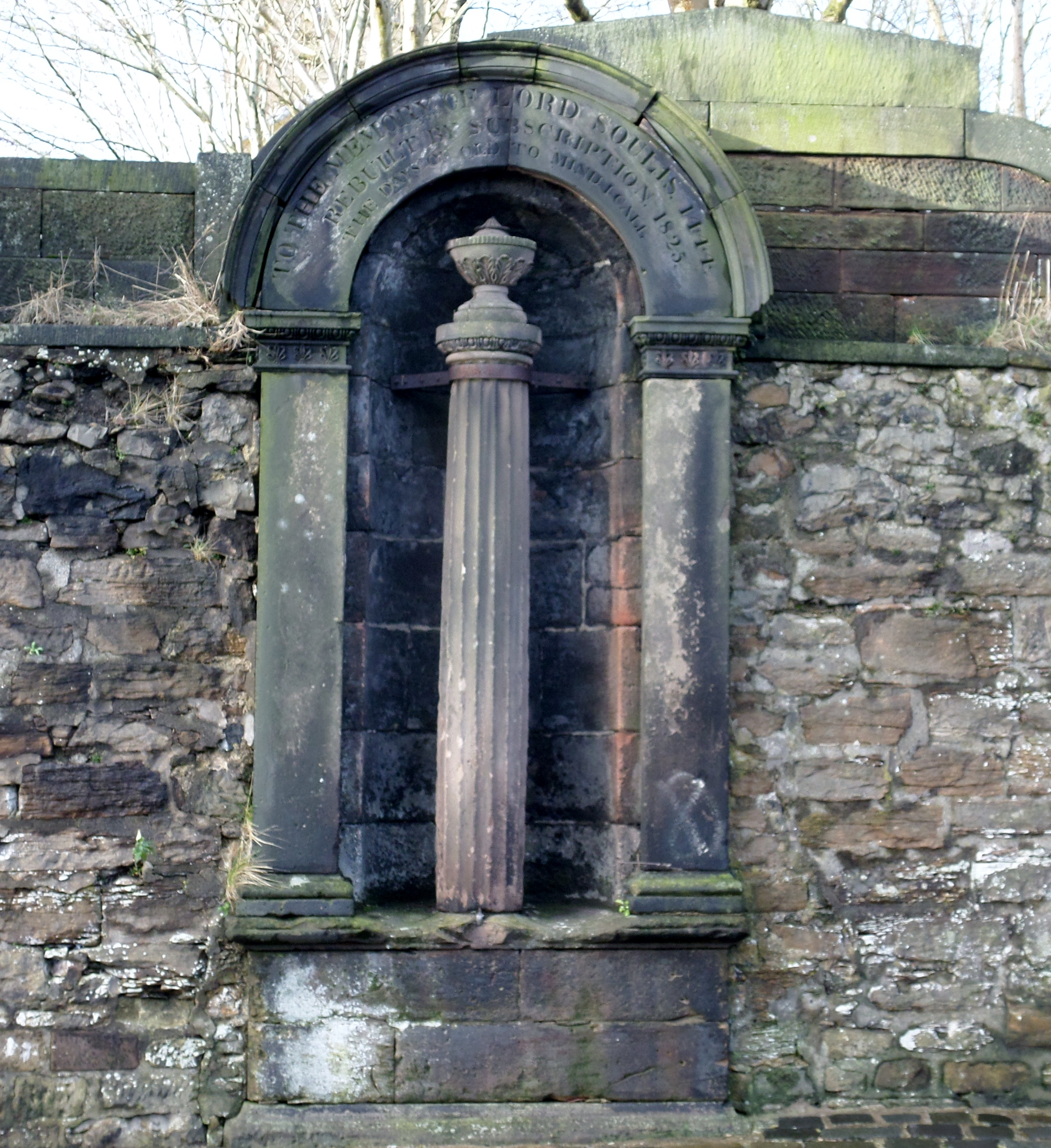
The 1825 Soulis Cross.

The ancient Soulis Cross was originally located in the centre of Soulis Street (NS43013821) near the Kilmarnock Water in Kilmarnock, East Ayrshire, Scotland. In 1825 a replacement cross in the form of a fluted pillar topped with an urn was erected using funds raised by public inscription and this was placed near the original site but located in an alcove situated within the high boundary wall of the High Kirk (NS43003820). A brass diamond mark was placed in the road to indicate the original site where Lord Soulis is said to have died, but this is no longer visible as it has become covered with tarmac.

== Description ==
Significantly the Soulis Cross is recorded by Timothy Pont and described as a stone pillar, 8 ft - 9 ft high. Some years before 1792 it was in a ruinous condition, but its stones were recovered and re-erected with a small gilt cross-like vane placed on the top. At this time an inscription "L Soules 1444" was carved on it as a record of the supposed killing of a Lord Soulis at the site. The shaft is octagonal, with two original sections topped by a 'new' pointed piece and has an approximately octagonal original base that stands on a later square base dating from 1890. It originally had three steps representing the Holy Trinity with the date '1600'.

Originally the shaft may have been topped by a stone cross that has been lost, an iron cross being added in the 19th century, a replica of which was made when it was restored for display in the museum. The top level of the base has a couple of holes that suggest that something metallic was once inserted such as a chain.

Some doubts have been expressed on a mid 15th century date for the old cross or even that the replaced cross is a further replacement for an even older original. Paterson regarded it as being the most significant of Kilmarnock's antiquities.

As stated, the old dilapidated cross was moved from Soulis Street in 1825 and is now on display in the town's Dick Institute with a plaque on the wall next to the replacement cross giving details of the death of Lord Soulis.

The inscription on the pediment above the alcove in which the replacement 'cross' stands reads "To the memory of Lord Soulis, A.D. 1444. Erected by subscription, A.D. 1825. The days of old to mind I call."

Crosses when erected on a significant spot sometimes could be a form of legal consecration of the site. in the later medieval period With the introduction of Gothic styles of architecture in the later medieval period the design of the crosses became more complex, usually having a stepped base known as the ‘Calvary’ from which preach could take place and with a ‘socket’ on top into which the cross shaft was placed.

Kilmarnock's market was located in the centre of the old town so the Soulis Cross was not a market cross and no records of an ancient near by church, abbey, etc exist to explain its location on the outskirts of the old town.

== History ==
Location of the Soulis Cross, Kilmarnock, East Ayrshire

Oddly the cross is said to commemorate the death of an Englishman, Lord Soulis, who was supposedly leading a force of English soldiers or 'Southrons' in an attempt to capture Dean Castle and with it the lands of Kilmarnock from the lords of the barony, the Boyds, Earls of Kilmarnock. It is very unusual for feudal lords to permit the erection of a memorial that celebrates the enemy, especially when the townsfolk are known to have celebrated the victory of the Boyds over the English.

A detailed but unsubstantiated report of the incident by Archibald McKay states that Lord Soulis and his English mercenaries were discovered at their camp on the Knockenlaw and were set upon by Lord Boyd, the laird of Craufurdland and others resulting in a skirmish in which several were killed on either side but due to the wooded nature of the land at the time eventually the two sides became separated and hostilities ceased. The next day this Lord Soulis and his remaining soldiers attempted to attack the Dean Castle however they were discovered and De Soulis was killed at the field known as the Clerk's Holm by Lord Boyd who shot him through the heart with an arrow using his cross-bow from his position across the Kilmarnock Water.

Pont's quote, written in the early 1600s, referring to the lands of Kilmarnock, was that "...it belonged first to ye Locartts Lordes therof then to the Lord Soulis and now the cheiffe duelling almoft for 300 zeirs of ye Lords Boyde. Neir to it is ther a ftone crosse called to this day Soulis Crosse quher they affirme ye Lord Soulis wes killed."

It is recorded that this part of Kilmarnock was once known as 'Middle Soulcross' which may or may not contain a clue as to the origin of the name.

=== Lord Soulis ===
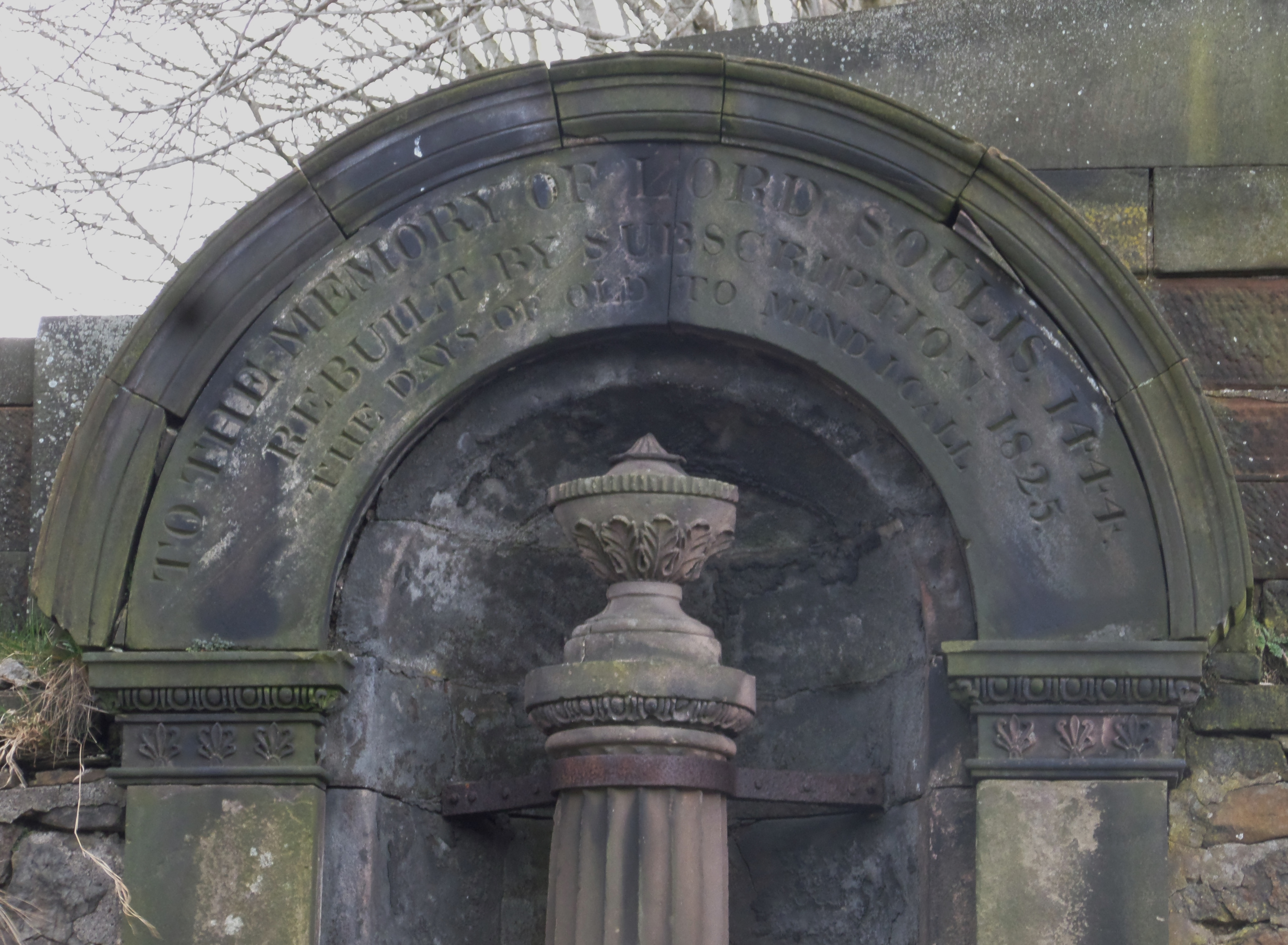
The inscription on the pediment above the 1825 Soulis Cross.

Lord Soulis is said to have been killed by an arrow or cross-bow bolt fired by one of the Boyd family, some sources say Lord Boyd himself, from the opposite bank of the Kilmarnock Water. More detail is given under the Knockenlaw section.

Timothy Pont records that the Lockharts followed by the Soulis family held the barony of Kilmarnock, however by 1444 this Soulis family had lost their power and influence having been after being punished by Robert the Bruce in the early 14th Century for their taking part in the 'Soulis Plot' against him. The De Soulis family had once been unsuccessful claimants to the throne of Scotland. Records also show that the Boyd's actually obtained the lands of Kilmarnock from John Balliol although they had passed to Robert the Bruce for around ten years at the time.

Robertson points out that the coat of arms of the De Soulis & De Morville families is identical and they may therefore have been related to this very powerful and influential family.

No record of a Lord Soulis has however been found for the dates 1444 or 1543 however and the story for the origin and significance of the Soulis Cross remains mired in confusion.

== The Knockenlaw Court incident ==
The coat of arms of the Boyds, Earls of Kilmarnock

It has been suggested that one explanation for the existence of the cross is a link with an incident that took place in the 16th century at Knockenlaw however this would require the date and the associated name to have become confused over the years, unlikely as the story was already fixed in legend in the early 17th century when Timothy Pont recorded it.

This mound, called Knockinglaw on the 1896 OS, still exists in very poor condition near Little Onthank just off the road to Kilmaurs. It was a tumulus in which urns had been found and due to its remote location it had a powder magazine built into it at one stage. It is involved in one of the versions of the stories of the killing of Lord Soulis. He is said to have been killed here in 1444 after leading a band of English mercenaries into the Kilmarnock area and then subsequently suffering a rout at the hands of the Boyd's of Dean Castle.

A final role of the mound was in the attempt at holding a barony court at Knockenlaw by the Earl of Glencairn, circa 1543 when he was attempting to claim the Lordship of Kilmarnock from the Boyd's. In the event the supporters of the Boyd's, including Mungo Mure of Rowallan turned up in force and the Earl had to abandon his attempt. A Roman Well, said to be of great antiquity was located nearby and the location had a commanding view of the surrounding countryside. These sites are now mostly hidden beneath housing estates.

It is recorded in 1845 that a farmer named Mr Clark of Knockinlaw found at a "Considerable depth beneath the Surface" an ancient iron sword that was said to have come from the skirmish that took place at this site on the day before the death of Lord Soulis.

== Lord Soulis of Hermitage Castle ==
A notorious Lord Soulis is linked with the evil redcaps at Hermitage Castle in the Borders. He could only be bound by a three-stranded rope of sand, but they got over the problem of hanging him by binding him in a lead sheet and boiling him to death for the murder of the Laird of Branxholm.

== See also ==
- Lord Soulis of Hermitage Castle
