= Loanhead Primary School =

Loanhead Primary School may refer to:

- Loanhead Primary School in Kilmarnock, East Ayrshire, Scotland; on List of listed buildings in Kilmarnock, East Ayrshire
- Loanhead Primary School in Loanhead, Midlothian, Scotland
