= Thomas Boyd of Kilmarnock =

Scottish landowner (fl. c. 1350)

Sir Thomas Boyd of Kilmarnock was a 14th-century Scottish landowner and lord of Kilmarnock in Ayrshire. He was the grandson of Sir Robert Boyd, who fought at the Battle of Bannockburn. In 1346, he was taken prisoner at the battle of Neville's Cross. He is known for building the earliest parts of Dean Castle in around 1350, and the castle still stands today and is open to the public. Sir Thomas was succeeded by his son, Thomas (died 1432). Sir Thomas' later descendants were the Earls of Kilmarnock.
