= Old Sheriff Court, Kilmarnock =

Judicial building in Kilmarnock, Scotland

Old Sheriff Court
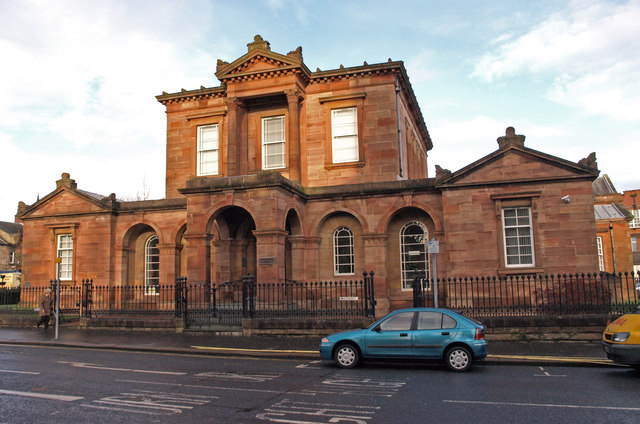
- The building in 2009

- Shown in East Ayrshire
- 55.6079°N 4.4992°W
- Location: St Marnock Street, Kilmarnock

History
- Built: 1852

Site notes
- Architect: William Railton
- Architectural style: Neoclassical style

Listed Building – Category B
- Official name: St Marnock Street, Procurator Fiscal's office (former court house) including boundary walls and railings
- Designated: 3 July 1980
- Reference no.: LB35964

The Old Sheriff Court is a judicial building on St Marnock Street in Kilmarnock in Scotland. The building, which currently accommodates the procurator fiscal's office, is a Category B listed building.

== History ==
Until the mid-1840s, all court hearings in Ayrshire took place in Ayr. However, in 1846, a sheriff-substitute was appointed, who was resident in Kilmarnock. The first hearing took place in November 1847. Initially, the sheriff-substitute had no courthouse, and, after finding this arrangement unsatisfactory, court officials decided to commission a new courthouse. The site they selected, on the north side of St Marnock Street, had been occupied by the former terminus of the Kilmarnock and Troon Railway, which opened in 1812. The new building was designed by William Railton in the neoclassical style, built in red sandstone and was opened by Sheriff Thomas Anderson, who held his first hearing there on 5 May 1852.

The design involved a symmetrical main frontage of seven bays on the ground floor, and three bays on the first floor, with the end bays slightly projected forward as pavilions, facing onto St Marnock Street. The central bay featured a large portico formed by four square columns with imposts supporting round headed openings with keystones. On the first floor there was a sash window flanked by Corinthian order columns supporting an entablature and a modillioned pediment with acroteria. On the ground floor, the two bays on either side of the central bay were fenestrated by recessed round headed windows flanked by rectangular columns with imposts supporting arches with keystones. On the first floor, the bays on either side of the central bay were fenestrated by sash windows with cornices. At roof level these bays were surmounted by a modillioned cornice. Internally, the principal room was the main courtroom which featured wooden panelling.

The building was extended to the rear in 1870, 1910 and, again, in 1985. As the number of court cases in Kilmarnock grew, it became necessary to commission a modern courthouse for criminal matters, and hearings moved to the new Kilmarnock Sheriff Court in December 1986. The old sheriff court was subsequently converted for use as the local procurator fiscal's office.

== See also ==
- List of listed buildings in Kilmarnock, East Ayrshire
