= List of listed buildings in Kilmarnock, East Ayrshire =

This is a list of listed buildings in the parish of Kilmarnock, the largest settlement within East Ayrshire, located on the west coast of Scotland. The town has served as the administrative centre of East Ayrshire Council since 1996. It has a total of 284 listed buildings and structures as designed by Historic Environment Scotland, including the Dick Institute, Dean Castle, Loanhead School and the original 1898 building of Kilmarnock Academy, with post–war developments of the controversial 1970s regeneration such as The Foregate and Clydesdale Bank building being considered for listed building status.

== List ==
Name	Location	Date Listed	Grid Ref. (Note: Sometimes known as OSGB36, the grid reference (where provided) is based on the British national grid reference system used by the Ordnance Survey. • "Guide to National Grid". Ordnance Survey. • "Get-a-map". Ordnance Survey.)	Geo-coordinates	Notes	LB Number (Note: Historic Environment Scotland assign a unique alphanumeric identifier to each designated site in Scotland, for listed buildings this always begins with "LB", for example "LB12345".)	Image
St Marnock Street, Procurator Fiscal's Office (Former Court House) Including Boundary Walls And Railings				55°36′28″N 4°29′57″W	Category B	35964	Upload another image See more images
Turner Place, Highfield (Formerly Laigh Kirk Manse)				55°37′15″N 4°29′26″W	Category C(S)	35969	Upload Photo
6 Grange Street, The Artist's House				55°36′36″N 4°30′00″W	Category B	35899	Upload Photo
51 And 53 John Finnie Street				55°36′33″N 4°29′59″W	Category B	35911	Upload Photo
Kay Park, Reformers' Monument				55°36′52″N 4°29′22″W	Category B	35926	Upload another image
London Road, Henderson Church, Church Of Scotland				55°36′26″N 4°29′04″W	Category C(S)	35933	Upload another image See more images
12 London Road, Including Boundary Wall And Gatepiers				55°36′34″N 4°29′25″W	Category B	35935	Upload Photo
21 - 29 (Odd Numbers) North Hamilton Street				55°36′40″N 4°30′18″W	Category B	35939	Upload another image
St Andrew's Street, St Andrew's Glencairn Church (Church Of Scotland), Including Churchyard And Boundary Walls				55°36′13″N 4°29′38″W	Category B	35959	Upload Photo
Gardener's Cottage, Rowallan				55°39′05″N 4°29′22″W	Category B	12526	Upload Photo
Stables, Rowallan				55°39′15″N 4°29′23″W	Category B	12528	Upload Photo
Dean Road, Dean Bridge At Dean Castle				55°37′25″N 4°28′58″W	Category C(S)	48712	Upload another image
London Road, Green Bridge				55°36′10″N 4°30′27″W	Category C(S)	48725	Upload Photo
Holehouse Road, 1 - 4 (Inclusive Numbers) Evelyn Villas, Boundary Walls And Gatepiers				55°36′37″N 4°29′14″W	Category B	48729	Upload Photo
Howard Park, North And South Entrances, Gates And Railings				55°36′21″N 4°30′02″W	Category C(S)	48734	Upload another image
5 And 7 Howard Street				55°36′23″N 4°30′07″W	Category C(S)	48736	Upload Photo
2 And 4 John Finnie Street And 26 West George Street, Former Ossington Hotel				55°36′42″N 4°29′54″W	Category C(S)	48740	Upload another image
Kay Park, Edward Vii Drinking Fountain				55°36′46″N 4°29′21″W	Category B	48741	Upload another image
81 - 83 King Street (Odd Numbers) And 2 Water Lane				55°36′30″N 4°29′50″W	Category C(S)	48747	Upload Photo
2 And 4 Loanhead Street				55°36′28″N 4°29′23″W	Category C(S)	48750	Upload Photo
10 Loanhead Street Including Boundary Walls				55°36′26″N 4°29′23″W	Category C(S)	48754	Upload Photo
Loanhead Street, Loanhead School, Including Janitor's House, Boundary Walls, Railings, Gatepiers And Playshelters				55°36′25″N 4°29′29″W	Category B	48755	Upload another image
44 London Road Including Boundary Walls And Gatepiers				55°36′28″N 4°29′04″W	Category C(S)	48762	Upload Photo
51 - 63 (Odd Numbers) Portland Road, Formerly Portland Terrace				55°36′31″N 4°30′23″W	Category C(S)	48768	Upload Photo
10 - 16 (Even Nos) Portland Road				55°36′27″N 4°30′05″W	Category B	48769	Upload Photo
22 And 24 Portland Road				55°36′28″N 4°30′07″W	Category B	48771	Upload Photo
6 - 10 (Even Numbers) Queen Street				55°36′28″N 4°29′47″W	Category C(S)	48777	Upload Photo
1 Walker Avenue, Including Boundary Wall And Railings				55°36′29″N 4°28′57″W	Category C(S)	48792	Upload Photo
Turner Place, Deanhill				55°37′13″N 4°29′27″W	Category C(S)	35970	Upload Photo
West Langlands Street, Caledonia Works				55°36′41″N 4°30′14″W	Category B	35973	Upload another image
Ayr Road, Treesbank				55°34′43″N 4°30′23″W	Category B	35873	Upload Photo
3 And 5 Bank Street (Scotch Corner) And 8 College Wynd				55°36′34″N 4°29′54″W	Category C(S)	35877	Upload Photo
46 Bank Street, Bank Of Scotland				55°36′32″N 4°29′54″W	Category B	35880	Upload another image
Dundonald Road, The Parsonage Including Boundary Wall And Gatepiers (To Holy Trinity Episcopal Church, Portland Road)				55°36′27″N 4°30′02″W	Category B	35885	Upload Photo
78 Dundonald Road, Westmont Including Boundary Walls And Gatepiers				55°36′11″N 4°30′25″W	Category B	35891	Upload Photo
Elmbank Avenue, Dick Institute				55°36′30″N 4°29′23″W	Category B	35892	Upload another image See more images
12 Grassyards Road, West Lodge Gateway And Gates To Kilmarnock Cemetery				55°36′47″N 4°29′00″W	Category B	35902	Upload another image
Green Street, Palace Theatre, Former Corn Exchange				55°36′35″N 4°29′40″W	Category A	35903	Upload another image See more images
25 - 29 (Odd Numbers) John Finnie Street				55°36′36″N 4°29′58″W	Category B	35907	Upload Photo
39 And 41 John Finnie Street				55°36′35″N 4°29′58″W	Category B	35909	Upload Photo
75-79 (Odd Nos) John Finnie Street, George Tannahill And Sons				55°36′30″N 4°30′00″W	Category B	35914	Upload Photo
John Finnie Street, District Council Offices				55°36′37″N 4°29′56″W	Category B	35918	Upload another image
58 - 62 (Even Numbers) John Finnie Street				55°36′35″N 4°29′57″W	Category B	35920	Upload Photo
77 London Road, Deanmont				55°36′36″N 4°29′05″W	Category B	35932	Upload Photo
41 Portland Road, Etruria				55°36′30″N 4°30′17″W	Category C(S)	35945	Upload Photo
Rowallan Castle				55°39′00″N 4°29′21″W	Category A	12523	Upload another image
Dean Road, Dean Castle Dower House				55°37′24″N 4°29′03″W	Category B	48713	Upload another image
21 Hill Street (Veterinary Practice) And Boundary Walls				55°36′50″N 4°29′52″W	Category C(S)	48727	Upload Photo
107-111 (Odd Nos) King Street				55°36′28″N 4°29′50″W	Category C(S)	48748	Upload Photo
59 And 61 London Road				55°36′28″N 4°29′13″W	Category C(S)	48757	Upload Photo
20, 22 And 22A London Road				55°36′32″N 4°29′18″W	Category C(S)	48760	Upload Photo
Sandbed Street, Sandbed Bridge				55°36′34″N 4°29′50″W	Category C(S)	48782	Upload Photo
3 Seaford Street Including Boundary Walls				55°36′24″N 4°30′12″W	Category C(S)	48783	Upload Photo
Strand Street, Former Hays And Goldberg's Warehouse (And Johnnie Walker Whisky Bonds)				55°36′37″N 4°29′52″W	Category B	48784	Upload another image
96-104 (Even Nos) Titchfield Street, Brigade Court				55°36′18″N 4°29′49″W	Category C(S)	48791	Upload Photo
Grougar Road, Former Crookedholm School				55°36′37″N 4°27′49″W	Category C(S)	49867	Upload Photo
Crookedholm, Main Road, Hurlford Church (Church Of Scotland), Formerly Reid Memorial Church With Boundary Wall And Church Hall				55°36′11″N 4°27′19″W	Category C(S)	50024	Upload Photo
1 And 3 St Marnock Place, 9 And 11 St Marnock Street, Former Borland's Seed Warehouse				55°36′28″N 4°29′53″W	Category B	35963	Upload Photo
Soulis Street, High Church (Church Of Scotland), Including Churchyard, Walls, Gatepiers And Soulis Monument				55°36′45″N 4°29′41″W	Category A	35965	Upload Photo
Dundonald Road, Winton Place Evangelical Union Congregational Church Including Hall, Boundary Walls And Railings				55°36′26″N 4°30′02″W	Category B	35886	Upload another image
8 Grange Terrace Including Boundary Wall				55°36′34″N 4°30′52″W	Category C(S)	35901	Upload Photo
16 - 28 (Even Numbers) John Finnie Street				55°36′39″N 4°29′55″W	Category B	35916	Upload Photo
72 - 84 (Even Numbers) John Finnie Street				55°36′34″N 4°29′57″W	Category B	35922	Upload Photo
36 And 38 London Road				55°36′29″N 4°29′09″W	Category B	35938	Upload Photo
37 Portland Road				55°36′59″N 4°30′16″W	Category C(S)	35944	Upload Photo
Braeside Street, Kilmarnock Academy, Including Janitor's House, Boundary Walls, Gatepiers, Gates And Railings				55°36′31″N 4°29′37″W	Category B	35958	Upload another image See more images
Lodge, Rowallan				55°38′46″N 4°29′21″W	Category B	12525	Upload Photo
Summerhouse And Walled Garden, Rowallan				55°39′03″N 4°29′19″W	Category B	12527	Upload Photo
36 - 40 (Even Nos) Bank Street				55°36′33″N 4°29′53″W	Category C(S)	48708	Upload Photo
1 - 14 (Inclusive Numbers) De Walden Terrace Including Boundary Walls And Outbuildings				55°36′38″N 4°29′16″W	Category B	48716	Upload Photo
Elmbank Drive, Kilmarnock Equitable Co-Operative Society Drinking Fountain				55°36′28″N 4°29′25″W	Category C(S)	48721	Upload Photo
11, 13 (Glen Rosa) And 15 High Glencairn Street				55°36′10″N 4°29′50″W	Category C(S)	48726	Upload Photo
Howard Park, Dr Alexander Marshall Monument				55°36′11″N 4°30′09″W	Category B	48730	Upload Photo
Howard Park, Old Men's Hut				55°36′15″N 4°30′08″W	Category C(S)	48732	Upload Photo
Crookedholm, Main Road, Former Hurlford Kirk And Manse, Including Boundary Walls And Gatepiers				55°36′13″N 4°27′29″W	Category B	42950	Upload Photo
26 - 34 (Even Nos) Bank Street				55°36′34″N 4°29′53″W	Category C(S)	35879	Upload Photo
Dean Road, Dean Castle And Gatehouse				55°37′23″N 4°29′01″W	Category A	35884	Upload another image See more images
31 - 37 (Odd Numbers) John Finnie Street Laigh Kirk Mission Hall				55°36′35″N 4°29′58″W	Category B	35908	Upload Photo
55 And 57 John Finnie Street				55°36′32″N 4°29′59″W	Category B	35912	Upload Photo
6 - 14 (Even Numbers) John Finnie Street (Facade Only)				55°36′40″N 4°29′55″W	Category B	35915	Upload Photo
Kilmarnock Railway Station				55°36′44″N 4°29′57″W	Category B	35928	Upload another image See more images
42 London Road (Formerly Hafton) Including Boundary Walls And Gatepiers				55°36′29″N 4°29′07″W	Category B	35941	Upload Photo
Portland Road, Holy Trinity Episcopal Church Including Hall, Boundary Walls, Gatepiers And Milestone				55°36′27″N 4°30′02″W	Category A	35946	Upload another image
Portland Road, Springhill House				55°36′30″N 4°30′30″W	Category B	35947	Upload Photo
78 And 80 Portland Street And 1 West George Street				55°36′42″N 4°29′50″W	Category B	35956	Upload Photo
St Andrew's Street, St Andrew's Church Hall				55°36′13″N 4°29′40″W	Category C(S)	35960	Upload Photo
Newhouse				55°37′00″N 4°27′38″W	Category B	12534	Upload Photo
Dean Road, Dean Castle Lodge And Boundary Walls				55°37′16″N 4°29′13″W	Category C(S)	48714	Upload Photo
7 And 8 Howard Park Drive				55°36′09″N 4°30′11″W	Category C(S)	48735	Upload Photo
9-13 (Odd Nos) King Street				55°36′35″N 4°29′49″W	Category C(S)	48744	Upload Photo
73 London Road, Torwood				55°36′27″N 4°29′06″W	Category C(S)	48758	Upload Photo
1 And 3 Portland Road				55°36′28″N 4°30′00″W	Category C(S)	48767	Upload Photo
18 And 20 Portland Road				55°36′28″N 4°30′06″W	Category B	48770	Upload Photo
26 Portland Road				55°36′28″N 4°30′08″W	Category B	48772	Upload Photo
12 Queen Street				55°36′28″N 4°29′47″W	Category C(S)	48778	Upload Photo
St Marnock Street, Road Bridge				55°36′27″N 4°29′52″W	Category C(S)	48780	Upload Photo
47 - 71 (Odd Numbers) Titchfield Street				55°36′21″N 4°29′51″W	Category C(S)	48787	Upload Photo
90 - 94 (Even Numbers) Titchfield Street				55°36′18″N 4°29′49″W	Category C(S)	48790	Upload Photo
13 - 15 (Odd Numbers) West George Street				55°36′42″N 4°29′52″W	Category B	48793	Upload Photo
44 And 46 Wellington Street Including Gatepiers And Boundary Walls				55°36′55″N 4°29′44″W	Category C(S)	35972	Upload Photo
Bank Street, The Laigh Kirk				55°36′35″N 4°29′52″W	Category A	35875	Upload another image See more images
3 Dundonald Road				55°36′25″N 4°30′02″W	Category C(S)	35887	Upload Photo
52 Dundonald Road Including Boundary Wall And Gatepier				55°36′15″N 4°30′15″W	Category C(S)	35889	Upload Photo
56 And 58 Dundonald Road, Invermay And Edelweiss				55°36′14″N 4°30′17″W	Category C(S)	35890	Upload Photo
10 Grange Place, Formerly Kilmarnock Standard Printing Office				55°36′33″N 4°30′01″W	Category B	35895	Upload Photo
5-9 (Odd Numbers) Grange Place				55°36′33″N 4°30′01″W	Category B	35898	Upload Photo
6 Grange Terrace Including Outbuilding And Boundary Wall				55°36′35″N 4°30′51″W	Category C(S)	35900	Upload Photo
43-49 (Odd Nos) John Finnie Street				55°36′34″N 4°29′59″W	Category C(S)	35910	Upload Photo
30 - 38 (Even Numbers) John Finnie Street				55°36′39″N 4°29′55″W	Category B	35917	Upload Photo
108 - 114 (Even Numbers) John Finnie Street (Former Kilmarnock Arms)				55°36′30″N 4°29′58″W	Category C(S)	35924	Upload Photo
Kilmarnock Railway Station, Subway To Garden Street				55°36′44″N 4°29′55″W	Category C(S)	35929	Upload Photo
40 And 40A London Road, Formerly Elmslie				55°36′29″N 4°29′08″W	Category B	35940	Upload Photo
Portland Road, The Lodge, Springhill House				55°36′29″N 4°30′24″W	Category B	35948	Upload Photo
Portland Street, West High Church Of Scotland And Boundary Walls				55°36′45″N 4°29′48″W	Category B	35957	Upload Photo
Crawfurdland Castle				55°38′10″N 4°27′17″W	Category A	12530	Upload Photo
Crawfurdland Mains				55°38′18″N 4°27′14″W	Category C(S)	12531	Upload Photo
Crawfurdland Bridge				55°38′27″N 4°26′34″W	Category B	12533	Upload Photo
Western Road, Former Southhook Pottery, Including Gates, Gatepiers, Boundary Walls And Railings				55°36′57″N 4°30′45″W	Category B	47422	Upload Photo
42 Bank Street				55°36′33″N 4°29′54″W	Category B	48709	Upload Photo
Dean Road (Near), Lauder Foot Bridge				55°37′11″N 4°29′04″W	Category C(S)	48715	Upload Photo
1-3 Dunlop Street And 12 Strand Street				55°36′39″N 4°29′54″W	Category C(S)	48720	Upload Photo
Kay Park Terrace, Edward Viii Pillar Box				55°36′41″N 4°29′05″W	Category B	48742	Upload Photo
Kilmarnock Station, K6 Telephone Kiosk				55°36′41″N 4°30′02″W	Category B	48743	Upload Photo
57 - 65 (Odd Numbers) King Street And 22 Sandbed Street, Victoria Buildings				55°36′31″N 4°29′50″W	Category C(S)	48746	Upload another image
Lawson Street, Belford Mill (Formerly Fleming's Lace Mill)				55°36′10″N 4°29′34″W	Category B	48749	Upload Photo
75 London Road Including Boundary Wall And Gatepier				55°36′26″N 4°29′05″W	Category C(S)	48759	Upload Photo
30 Samson Avenue, Provost Lamp				55°36′19″N 4°28′55″W	Category B	48781	Upload Photo
24 Titchfield Street, Former King's Theatre And Abc Cinema				55°36′22″N 4°29′48″W	Category B	48789	Upload Photo
Dundonald Road, Mount House Including Gatepiers And Railings				55°36′07″N 4°31′35″W	Category B	43910	Upload Photo
Bank Street, Laigh Kirk Graveyard And Gatepiers				55°36′35″N 4°29′53″W	Category B	35876	Upload Photo
3 Grange Place				55°36′33″N 4°30′00″W	Category C(S)	35897	Upload Photo
3-9 (Odd Numbers) John Finnie Street, Kilmarnock Club				55°36′37″N 4°29′57″W	Category B	35905	Upload Photo
John Finnie Street, Council Chambers				55°36′36″N 4°29′55″W	Category B	35919	Upload Photo
100 - 106 (Even Numbers) John Finnie Street				55°36′31″N 4°29′58″W	Category C(S)	35923	Upload Photo
Kay Park, Burns Monument And Former Museum				55°36′46″N 4°29′23″W	Category B	35925	Upload another image
71 London Road, Including Boundary Walls And Gate Piers				55°36′27″N 4°29′07″W	Category B	35931	Upload Photo
Portland Road, Former Stables And Boundary Wall To Springhill House				55°36′29″N 4°30′29″W	Category B	35949	Upload Photo
Portland Street And Soulis Street, Viaduct				55°36′43″N 4°29′45″W	Category B	35951	Upload Photo
1 - 9 (Odd Numbers) Portland Street, Former Royal Bank Of Scotland				55°36′37″N 4°29′47″W	Category B	35952	Upload Photo
Rowallan -				55°39′10″N 4°29′33″W	Category A	12524	Upload Photo
Assloss				55°37′47″N 4°28′07″W	Category B	12529	Upload Photo
1 Bank Place, Kilmarnock Standard				55°36′33″N 4°29′56″W	Category C(S)	48706	Upload Photo
82 Dundonald Road				55°36′10″N 4°30′27″W	Category C(S)	48718	Upload Photo
Glasgow Road, Milestone (Opposite End Of Arran Avenue)				55°37′25″N 4°29′20″W	Category C(S)	48723	Upload Photo
Hill Street, St Joseph's Catholic Church And Priest's House				55°36′49″N 4°29′50″W	Category B	48728	Upload another image
Howard Park, Park Keeper's House				55°36′14″N 4°30′10″W	Category C(S)	48733	Upload Photo
47 And 47A London Road				55°36′30″N 4°29′20″W	Category B	48756	Upload Photo
70 London Road, Stanely				55°36′25″N 4°28′43″W	Category C(S)	48763	Upload Photo
2 And 4 Low Glencairn Street, Former Co - Operative Building				55°36′03″N 4°29′48″W	Category C(S)	48766	Upload Photo
28 And 30 Portland Road				55°36′28″N 4°30′09″W	Category B	48776	Upload Photo
32 Sturrock Street, Lilymount				55°36′24″N 4°29′39″W	Category C(S)	48785	Upload Photo
West Shaw Street, Bridge				55°36′04″N 4°30′02″W	Category C(S)	48794	Upload Photo
47 Woodstock Street, Woodstock Cottage Including Boundary Walls And Railings				55°36′35″N 4°30′14″W	Category C(S)	48795	Upload Photo
3, 5 And 7 St Marnock Street And 113 - 119 (Odd Numbers) King Street				55°36′27″N 4°29′50″W	Category C(S)	35962	Upload Photo
Woodstock Street, Grange Free Church, Including Hall, Boundary Walls, Railings And Gatepiers				55°36′34″N 4°30′06″W	Category B	35974	Upload Photo
Campbell Street, New Riccarton Bridge				55°35′50″N 4°29′50″W	Category C(S)	35881	Upload Photo
5 Dundonald Road Including Boundary Walls And Outbuildings				55°36′24″N 4°30′02″W	Category C(S)	35888	Upload Photo
London Road, Sir James Shaw's Statue				55°36′32″N 4°29′25″W	Category B	35930	Upload another image See more images
St Marnock Street, St Marnock's Parish Church (Church Of Scotland)				55°36′26″N 4°29′57″W	Category B	35961	Upload another image See more images
37 Bank Street And 20 Nelson Street				55°36′31″N 4°29′57″W	Category C(S)	48707	Upload Photo
58 - 62 (Even Nos) Bank Street And 22-24 (Even Nos) Nelson Street				55°36′31″N 4°29′55″W	Category B	48711	Upload Photo
Elmbank Drive, War Memorial				55°36′31″N 4°29′26″W	Category B	48722	Upload another image See more images
Howard Park, Cholera Monument				55°36′04″N 4°30′05″W	Category C(S)	48731	Upload another image See more images
45 London Road, Kilmarnock Masonic Halls				55°36′32″N 4°29′27″W	Category B	48764	Upload Photo
5 - 7 (Odd Numbers) St Marnock Place				55°36′30″N 4°29′52″W	Category C(S)	48779	Upload Photo
141 - 145 (Odd Numbers) Titchfield Street And Douglas Street				55°36′15″N 4°29′51″W	Category C(S)	48788	Upload Photo
116-118 (Even Nos) John Finnie Street				55°36′29″N 4°29′58″W	Category C(S)	49625	Upload Photo
15 Strand Street, Formerly Part Of Hays And Goldberg's Warehouse				55°36′36″N 4°29′51″W	Category C(S)	35966	Upload Photo
24 Sturrock Street, Conservative Club, Including Boundary Wall				55°36′30″N 4°29′42″W	Category B	35967	Upload Photo
26 Sturrock Street, Former Reading Room				55°36′30″N 4°29′43″W	Category C(S)	35968	Upload Photo
Ayr Road, Blacksyke Tower				55°35′06″N 4°30′52″W	Category C(S)	35872	Upload Photo
Ayr Road, Stables At Treesbank				55°34′44″N 4°30′25″W	Category C(S)	35874	Upload Photo
7 Bank Street				55°36′34″N 4°29′54″W	Category C(S)	35878	Upload Photo
Elmbank Avenue, Former Kilmarnock Technical School Including Gatepiers And Railings				55°36′29″N 4°29′29″W	Category B	35893	Upload another image
Elmbank Drive, St Columba's Primary School Including Boundary Wall, Gatepiers, Gates And Railings				55°36′28″N 4°29′36″W	Category C(S)	35894	Upload another image
11 - 15 (Odd Numbers) Grange Place And 24 And 26 (Even Numbers) Grange Street, Formerly Wylie's Grain Store				55°36′34″N 4°30′02″W	Category B	35896	Upload Photo
Irvine Road, Annanhill House (Former Kilmarnock Golf Club House)				55°36′31″N 4°31′12″W	Category B	35904	Upload Photo
John Finnie Street, Central Evangelical Church				55°36′36″N 4°29′58″W	Category C(S)	35906	Upload Photo
73 John Finnie Street, Post Office				55°36′31″N 4°30′00″W	Category B	35913	Upload Photo
64 - 70 (Even Numbers) John Finnie Street				55°36′34″N 4°29′57″W	Category B	35921	Upload Photo
10 London Road				55°36′33″N 4°29′26″W	Category C(S)	35934	Upload Photo
14 London Road Including Boundary Walls And Gatepiers				55°36′33″N 4°29′23″W	Category C(S)	35936	Upload Photo
28 London Road, Rosehill, Including Boundary Wall And Gatepiers				55°36′31″N 4°29′14″W	Category B	35937	Upload Photo
Old Street, Old Riccarton Bridge				55°35′50″N 4°29′48″W	Category B	35942	Upload another image
Old Street, Riccarton Parish Church (Church Of Scotland), Including Boundary Walls, Gatepiers, Railings, Gates And Kirkyard				55°35′45″N 4°29′45″W	Category B	35943	Upload another image See more images
Crawfurdland				55°38′03″N 4°27′27″W	Category C(S)	12532	Upload Photo
35 Dundonald Road, Boundary Wall And Corner Pier				55°36′18″N 4°30′11″W	Category C(S)	48717	Upload Photo
90 Dundonald Road, Auchenheath Including Boundary Wall And Gatepiers				55°36′08″N 4°30′30″W	Category C(S)	48719	Upload Photo
14 And 16 Glencairn Square, The Hunting Lodge				55°36′03″N 4°29′47″W	Category C(S)	48724	Upload Photo
Irvine Road, Annanhill House, Walled Garden				55°36′31″N 4°31′05″W	Category C(S)	48737	Upload Photo
45-55 (Odd Nos) King Street, Formerly Lauder's Emporium				55°36′32″N 4°29′50″W	Category C(S)	48745	Upload Photo
6 And 8 Loanhead Street				55°36′27″N 4°29′23″W	Category C(S)	48751	Upload Photo
34 London Road				55°36′30″N 4°29′10″W	Category C(S)	48761	Upload Photo
London Road, Milestone (To South West Of 18 London Road)				55°36′32″N 4°29′21″W	Category C(S)	48765	Upload Photo
43 Titchfield Street, Former Headquarters Of The 4Th Battalion Of The Royal Scots Fusiliers				55°36′22″N 4°29′51″W	Category C(S)	48786	Upload Photo

== Key ==
The scheme for classifying buildings in Scotland is:

- Category A: "buildings of national or international importance, either architectural or historic; or fine, little-altered examples of some particular period, style or building type."
- Category B: "buildings of regional or more than local importance; or major examples of some particular period, style or building type, which may have been altered."
- Category C: "buildings of local importance; lesser examples of any period, style, or building type, as originally constructed or moderately altered; and simple traditional buildings which group well with other listed buildings."

In March 2016 there were 47,288 listed buildings in Scotland. Of these, 8% were Category A, and 50% were Category B, with the remaining 42% being Category C.

== See also ==
- List of listed buildings in East Ayrshire
