= Kilmarnock Sheriff Court =

Judicial building in Kilmarnock, Scotland

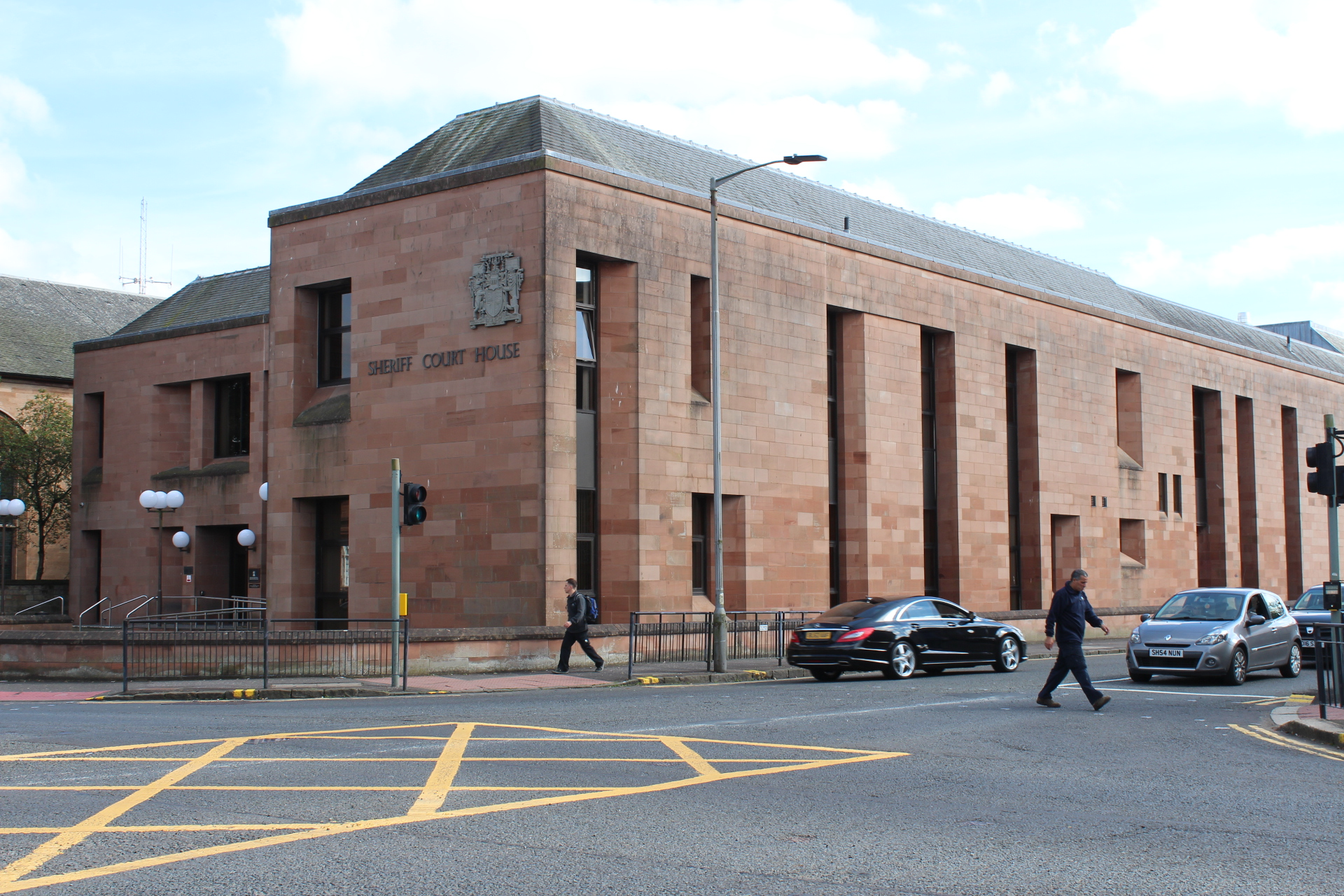
- The building in 2016

- Shown in East Ayrshire
- 55.6072°N 4.4996°W
- Location: St Marnock Street, Kilmarnock

History
- Built: 1986

Site notes
- Architect: Property Services Agency
- Architectural style: Modern style

Kilmarnock Sheriff Court is a judicial building on St Marnock Street in Kilmarnock in Scotland. The building operates as a courthouse within the sheriffdom of North Strathclyde.

== History ==
Until the mid-1980s, hearings took place at the Old Sheriff Court in St Marnock Street. However, as the number of court cases in Kilmarnock grew, it became necessary to commission a modern courthouse for criminal matters. The site court officials selected was on the south side of St Marnock Street facing the Old Sheriff Court. The new building was designed by the Property Services Agency in the modern style, built in red sandstone and was officially opened in December 1986.

The design involved an asymmetrical main frontage of four bays facing onto St Marnock Street with the right-hand bay projected forward. The second bay on the left contained a short flight of steps leading up to a recessed glass doorway, which was flanked by lancet windows; there was a large casement window on the first floor, also flanked by lancet windows. The first bay on the left was fenestrated by lancet windows on both floors, while the third bay was fenestrated by sets of three lancet windows on both floors. The corner between the third and fourth bays was canted and fenestrated with casement windows on both floors. The right-hand bay was fenestrated by lancet windows on both floors on the left-hand side, and featured a Royal coat of arms high up on the wall on the right-hand side. Internally, the building was laid out to accommodate six courtrooms.

== Operations ==
The court deals with both criminal and civil cases. There are currently five sheriffs in post at Kilmarnock Sheriff Court. They sit alone in civil cases and are assisted by a jury of fifteen members selected from the electoral roll in some criminal cases (cases involving solemn proceedings only). The Sheriff Principal is Sean Murphy.
