= Dean Castle =

14th-century Scottish castle

- Dean Park, Kilmarnock in Scotland
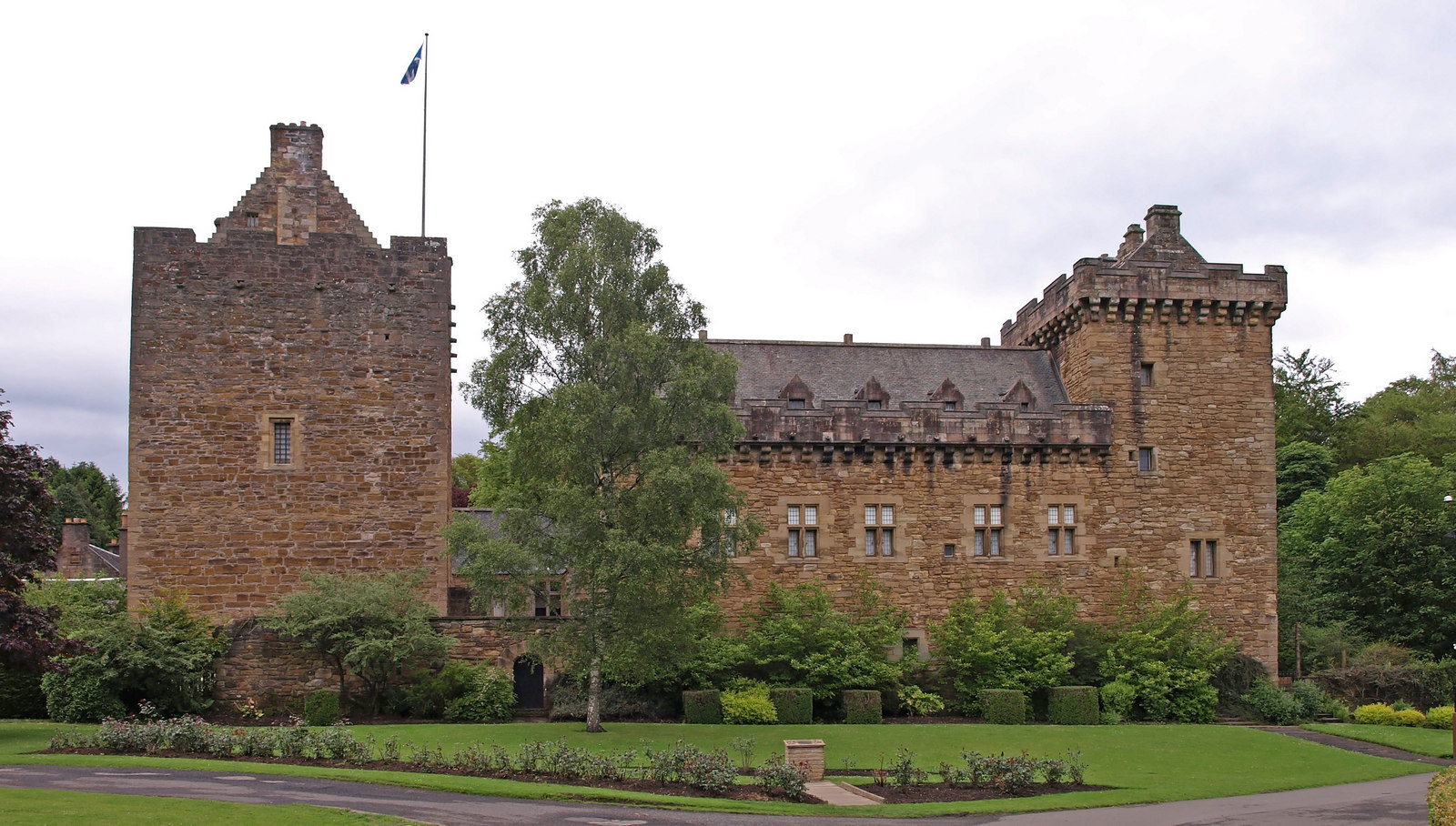
- Dean Castle in 2024, with Dower House situated to the left of the castle

Site information
- Type: Tower house with courtyard
- Owner: "The People of Kilmarnock"; East Ayrshire Council
- Operator: Ayrshire360
- Open to the public: Yes
- Condition: Preserved
- Visitor numbers: 900,000 approx (2011)

Location
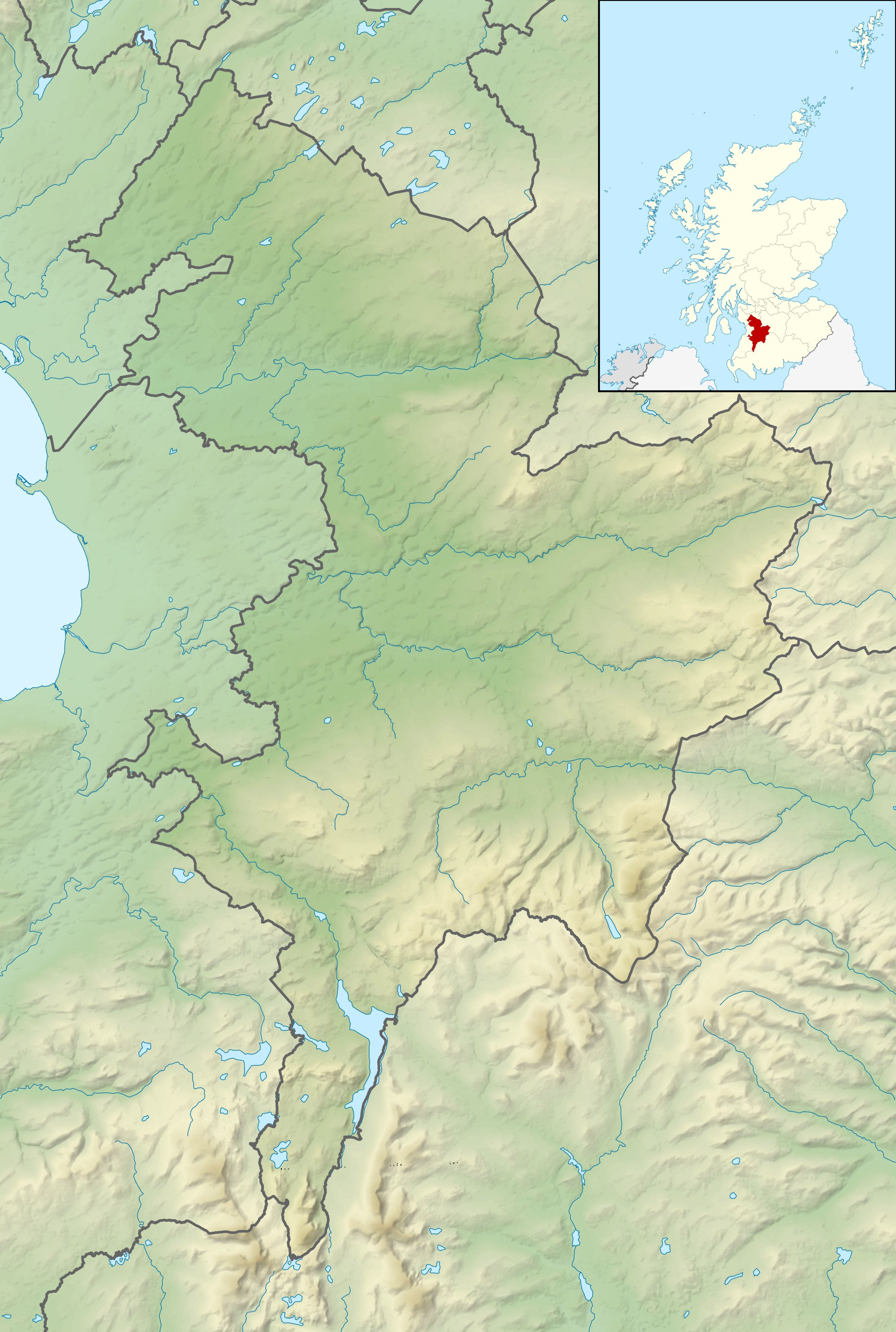
- Location within East Ayrshire
- Coordinates: 55.6231°N 4.4837°W
- Grid reference: grid reference NS437394
- Area: 200-acre (80-hectare)
- Height: 63ft (Keep)

Site history
- Built: c. 1350
- Built by: The Boyd Family of the Burgh of Kilmarnock
- In use: Until c. 1975
- Materials: Stone
- Battles/wars: Scottish Wars of Independence (indirect, association only); Battle of Loudoun Hill (indirect, association only)

Dean Castle is a 14th century castle located in Kilmarnock, East Ayrshire, Scotland. It was the stronghold for the Boyd Family, who were lords of Kilmarnock for over 400 years, and is situated in a 200-acre (80-hectare) site situated within the Dean Castle Country Park. The castle contains a museum collection of European arms and armour, and features an extensive collection of early musical instruments.

Originally known as Kilmarnock Castle (or Kilmarnock Castell) until 1700, it gradually took its name from the dean or wooded valley, a common place name in Scotland. Owned originally by the Boyd family, it has strong historical connections with many people and events famous in Scottish history. Robert the Bruce who gave the Boyds these lands; James III of Scotland whose sister married a Boyd; the Covenanters, some of whom were imprisoned here; Bonnie Prince Charlie, whose rebellion was joined by the 4th Earl of Kilmarnock and Robert Burns who was encouraged to publish his poetry by the Earl of Glencairn who owned the Castle at that time.

Today, the castle is owned and operated by East Ayrshire Leisure, a department of East Ayrshire Council, and is one of the top visitor attractions in across Ayrshire. It has been designated Category A listed building status by Historic Environment Scotland, who cite its "chequered past" as a defining feature of the castles significance. Visitor numbers to the castle in 2011 were estimated at 900,000.

== History ==
=== Clan Boyd ownership ===
Clan Boyd came into possession of the grounds of Dean Castle in 1316, when Sir Robert Boyd was rewarded the lands of Kilmarnock and West Kilbride by King Robert I for his services at the Battle of Bannockburn.

=== Transfer of ownership ===
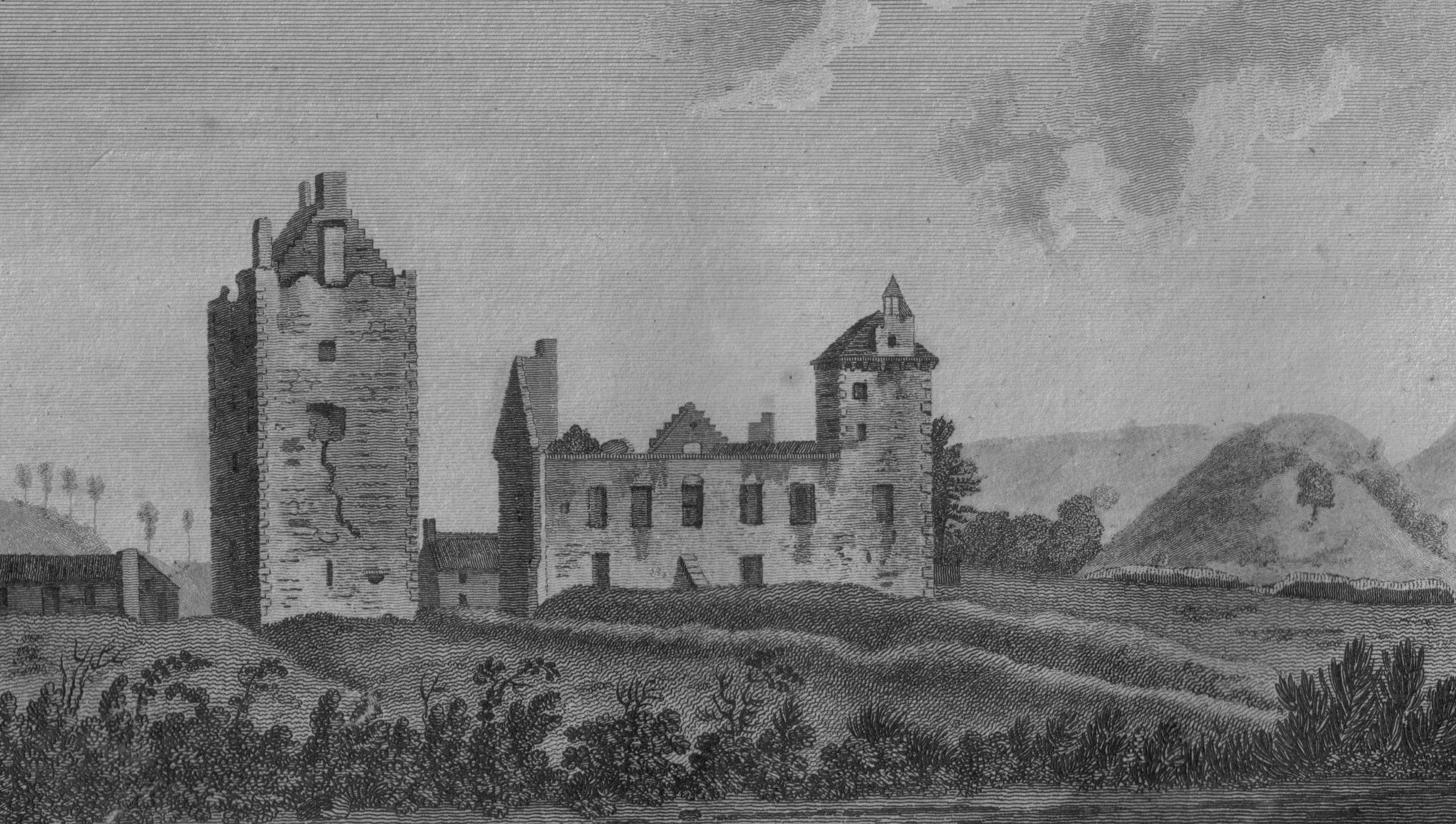
Dean Castle in 1790

Dean Castle and Country Park is maintained by East Ayrshire Council and is free to access. There are daily tours of the castle which are also free. In 1975 the 9th Lord Howard de Walden gave the castle, estate, his father's collections of arms and armour, and his grandfather's collection of musical instruments to the people of Kilmarnock.

The collections of arms and armour are on display in the Great Hall of the keep and the musical instruments are on display in the solar of the keep. The banqueting hall displays many items owned by East Ayrshire council including Kilmarnock Edition of Robert Burns poetry and many works of art. The private chamber of the Earls of Kilmarnock has a complete model of the castle. Legend has it that after the 4th Earl of Kilmarnock was beheaded for treason in London on 18 August 1746 his head was carried back to Dean castle and was stored in a large chest which is still present in the Laigh Tower.

The story of the 4th Earl's head being kept in the castle has attracted many ghost hunters who have studied the castle and believe there is a presence in the palace. A large bust of William Wallace is on display on the ground floor of the palace.

=== Restoration project ===
From 2020 until late 2022-early 2023, Dean Castle has undergone extensive restoration work to the main castle structure, including pointing work and amending structural issues and defects. East Ayrshire Council, supported by East Ayrshire Leisure, receive an award in the sum of £ 1.5 million from the Heritage Lottery Fund in order for the restoration and modernisation of Dean Castle to commence. The project has a total cost of £5.2million, with funding of £500,000 also secured from Historic Environment Scotland, whilst the remainder costs were to be met from East Ayrshire Council.

== Overview ==
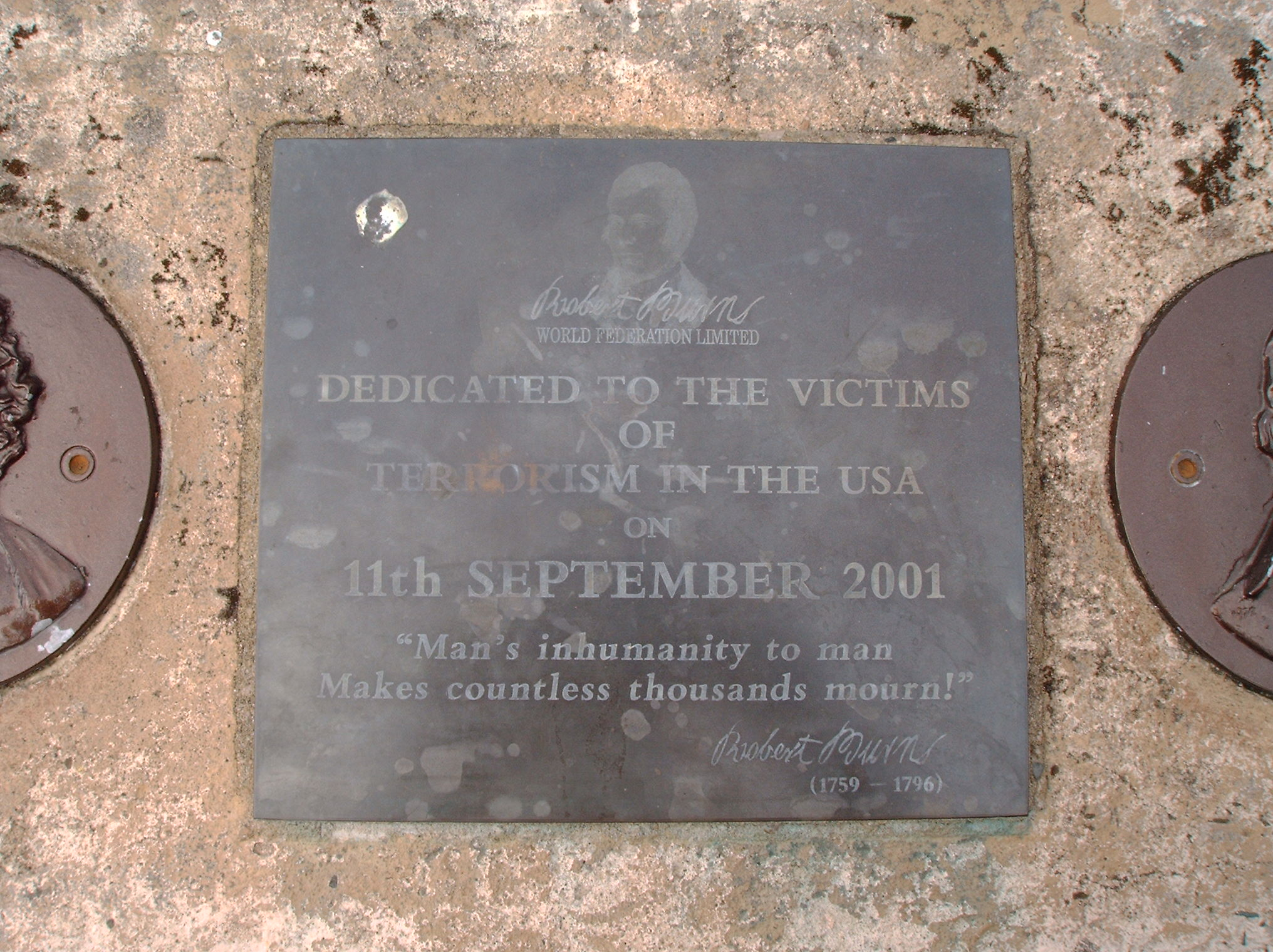
The 9/11 memorial plaque

The grounds which house the castle, Dean Castle Country Park, is 200 acres (80 hectares) in area and houses numerous wildlife animals. As the castle and grounds are open to the general public, there is access to cafes and play parks, as well as a Rural Life Centre and Visitor Centre. The castle and its ground have played host to numerous events in recent times. Illumnight, a light show, was created in 2017 and by its second year had attracted over 80,000 visitors and had become one of the UK's most speculator illumination event. Spirit of Christmas was launched in 2022 which features Christmas themed lights projected onto the castle.

The Robert Burns World Federation recently unveiled a plaque to the memory of those who lost their lives in the terrorist attacks on 11 September 2001.

The plaque reads:

Dedicated to the victims of terrorism in the USA on 11 September 2001. Man's inhumanity to man makes countless thousands mourn!
— Robert Burns (1759–1796)

== Castle layout ==
=== Keep ===
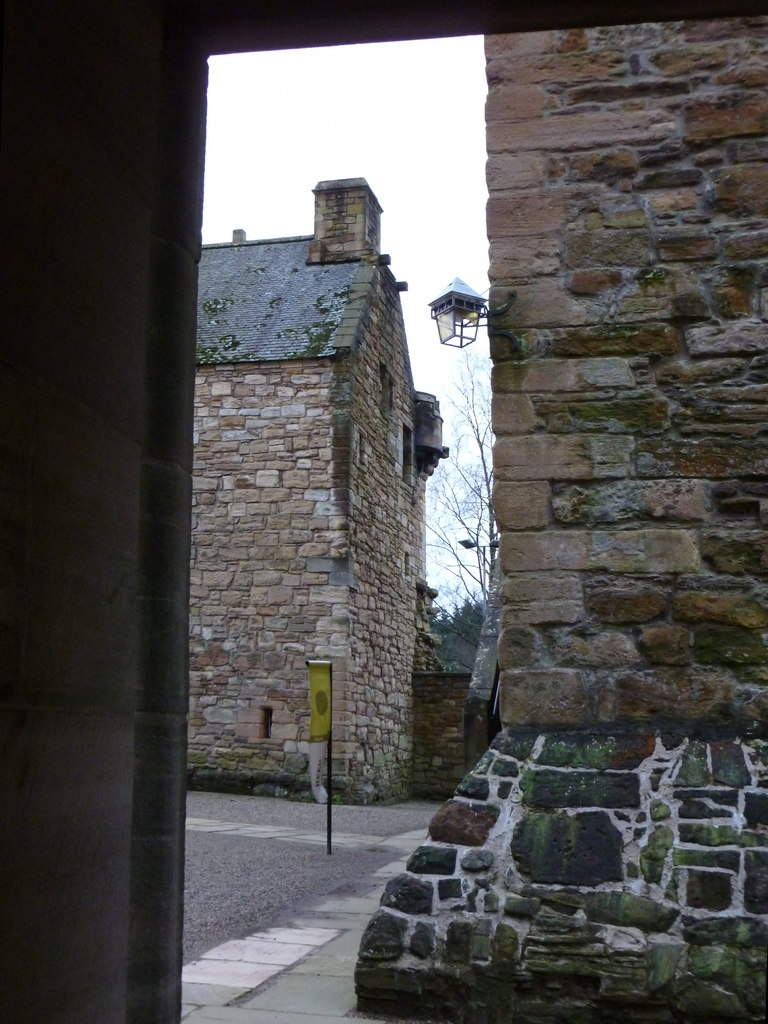
The Keep and Banquette House at the castle

The Keep was built around 1350 by Sir Robert Boyd's son Sir Thomas Boyd. It was built mainly for defence, the walls are 2–3 metres thick, it has few windows, and the original entrance is high above ground level. There are no arrowslits in the walls of Dean Castle something which is very rare for a Scottish castle of this time period, all of the shooting was done from the battlements at the top. In its current form, the keep houses many artefacts belonging to the Boyd family and medieval times in general, as well as various collections of arms and armour.

=== Palace ===
The first section of palace was built in the mid 1300s by Sir Robert Boyd (1st Lord Boyd) and his son Sir Thomas Boyd. Originally, the Palace of the castle was known as "the place". The lands having been given to Sir Robert Boyd for his loyal service in the Scottish Wars for Independence. In 1735 an accidental fire started in the kitchen of the palace, this fire then spread onto the thatched roof where it then spread onto the roof of the keep. The Castle was a complete ruin after this and had almost two centuries of neglect, although some of the buildings always remained in use. The resident of the castle William Boyd, 4th Earl of Kilmarnock had financial problems and could not afford to repair the castle.

The palace was mainly designed for comfort. On the ground floor of the palace was the kitchen with a large fireplace and oven. The first floor has the banqueting hall, and above on the second hall had bedrooms for the family. The original staircase leading up to the first floor was a wooden one which ran up the outside of the building; however, due to the wet climate a stone staircase was later added inside the palace.

Defence was not ignored in the construction of the palace. The tower has projecting battlements and Lord Boyd's private apartments were inside. This tower was known as the Laigh or Low Tower; although high, it is lower than the keep. Also the courtyard was protected by a high wall which was called the Barmkin. This protected the various other buildings housed in the courtyard, such as stables, stores and blacksmiths.

=== Rebuilding ===
The castle was sold by James Boyd in 1746 and the estate changed hands many times. When the 8th Lord Howard de Walden inherited the castle he began its restoration. He completed the keep in 1908 and completed the restoration of the palace in 1946.

The present Gatehouse was entirely built in 1935–36. It was never present in the original castle. However, it is carefully copied from real sixteenth-century buildings, including details like the windows with half-wooden shutters and half-leaded glass. The overall design and decorative but usable gun loops are copied from the gatehouse built at Tolquhon Castle, Aberdeenshire built in the 1580s. The wooden walkway around the wall guarding the palace was added in the restoration. The castle and gatehouse were designated as a Category A listed building in 1971.

=== Interior ===
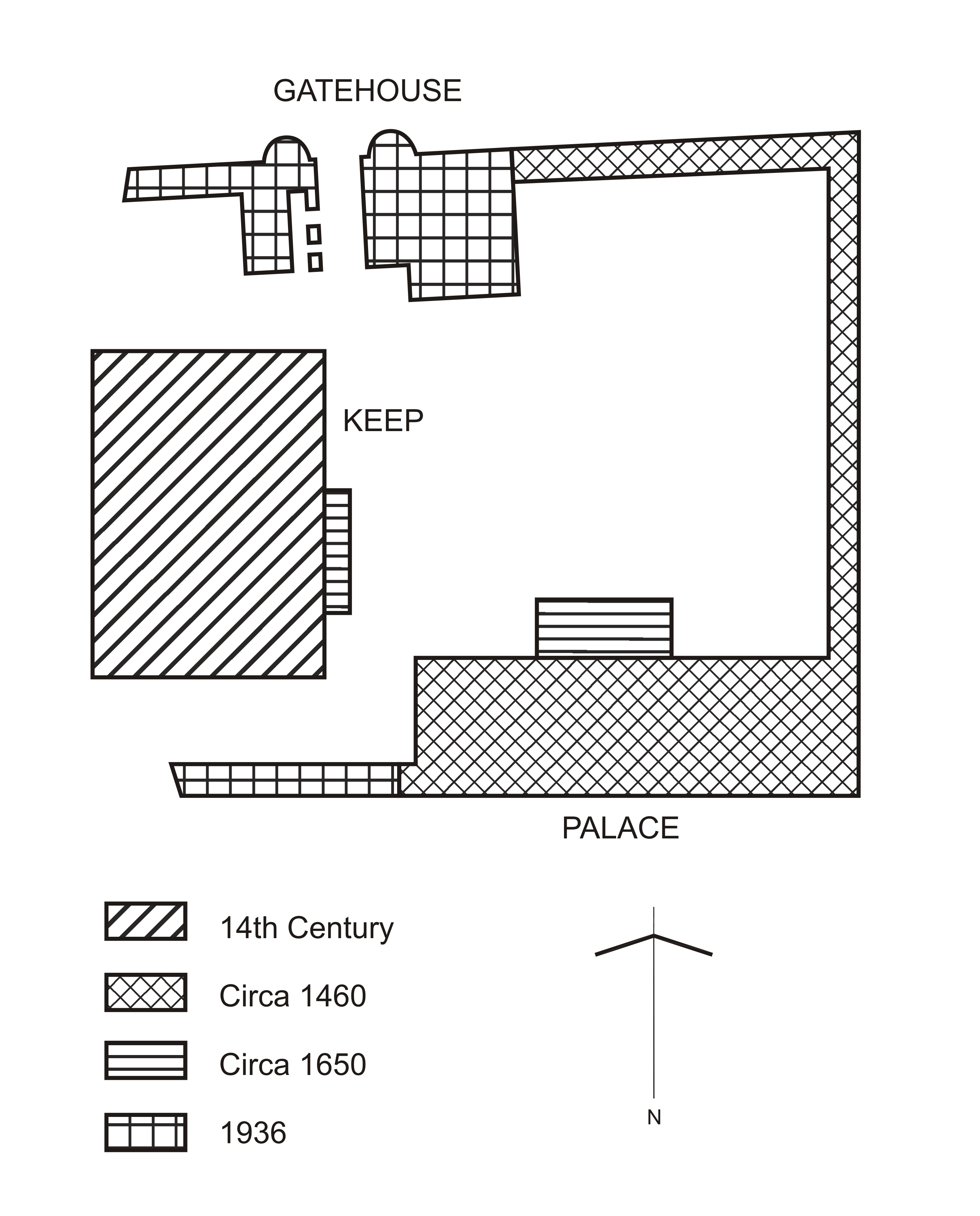
Floorplan of Dean Castle, showing dates of the buildings

==== Ground floor ====
The keep has four floors and the ground floor housed the cellar which housed the original kitchen for the Great hall above. Also on the ground floor was the bottleneck dungeon. When the keep was originally built both the kitchen and dungeon could only be accessed from the first floor via a ladder, there were no doors leading outside.

==== First floor ====
The first floor is where the Great Hall with its large vaulted ceiling is situated. The Great Hall was mainly used for grand banquets and entertainment for the lord and his guests. Guests staying at the castle would have also slept on the floor of the Great Hall. The Hall also served as a court as the lord would act as a judge passing verdicts and sentences for crimes committed in the surrounding area.

The first floor also has a minstrel's gallery where a group of travelling minstrels would play instruments and act for the Lord and Lady sitting below. Off the minstrel's gallery is the minstrels changing room, where the travelling players would change into their bright costumes. This room would also have been used by the minstrels to sleep in; the reason for them having their own private quarters was that it was feared that many of them would have been carrying disease. They slept here to stop them passing any ailments on to other guests. The guard room also sits on the first floor. The guard room has the only access to the dungeon in the castle, a small hole in the floor where prisoners were thrown in. A guard would always be present in this room to both guard the dungeon but also the only entrance to the castle, a small door above ground level, which is next to the guard room.

==== Second floor ====
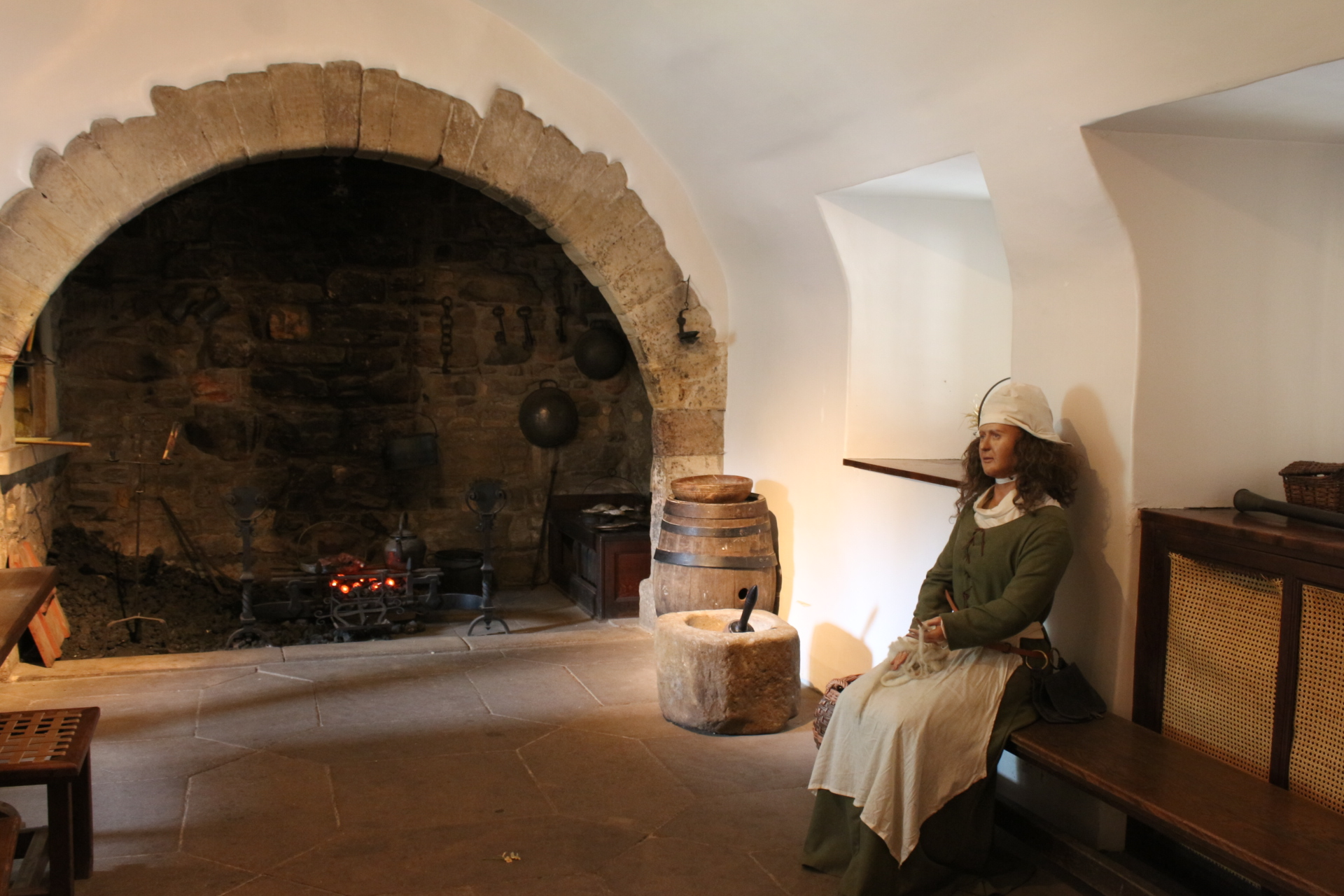
The interior of the Dean Castle kitchen

The second floor houses the solar a large room, used as the private chambers for the Lord and Lady. The solar could be split into two using a large curtain, one half for Ladies and the other for men. There are two fireplaces in the solar one on each side for either sex.

The solar also houses a small private chapel. This was used by the Lord and Lady of the castle and a priest who stayed in the castle would deliver mass to the family. A small ladies bowyer is present on this floor also.

The castle's third floor is on top of the keep where archers could defend the castle if attacked. On the third floor there is also a small set of apartments for soldiers to stay in.

== In popular culture ==
- The castle featured in season 2 of Outlander as Beaufort Castle, the seat of Clan Fraser of Lovat.

== See also ==
- Castles in Scotland
- List of listed buildings in Kilmarnock, East Ayrshire
