= Dick Institute =

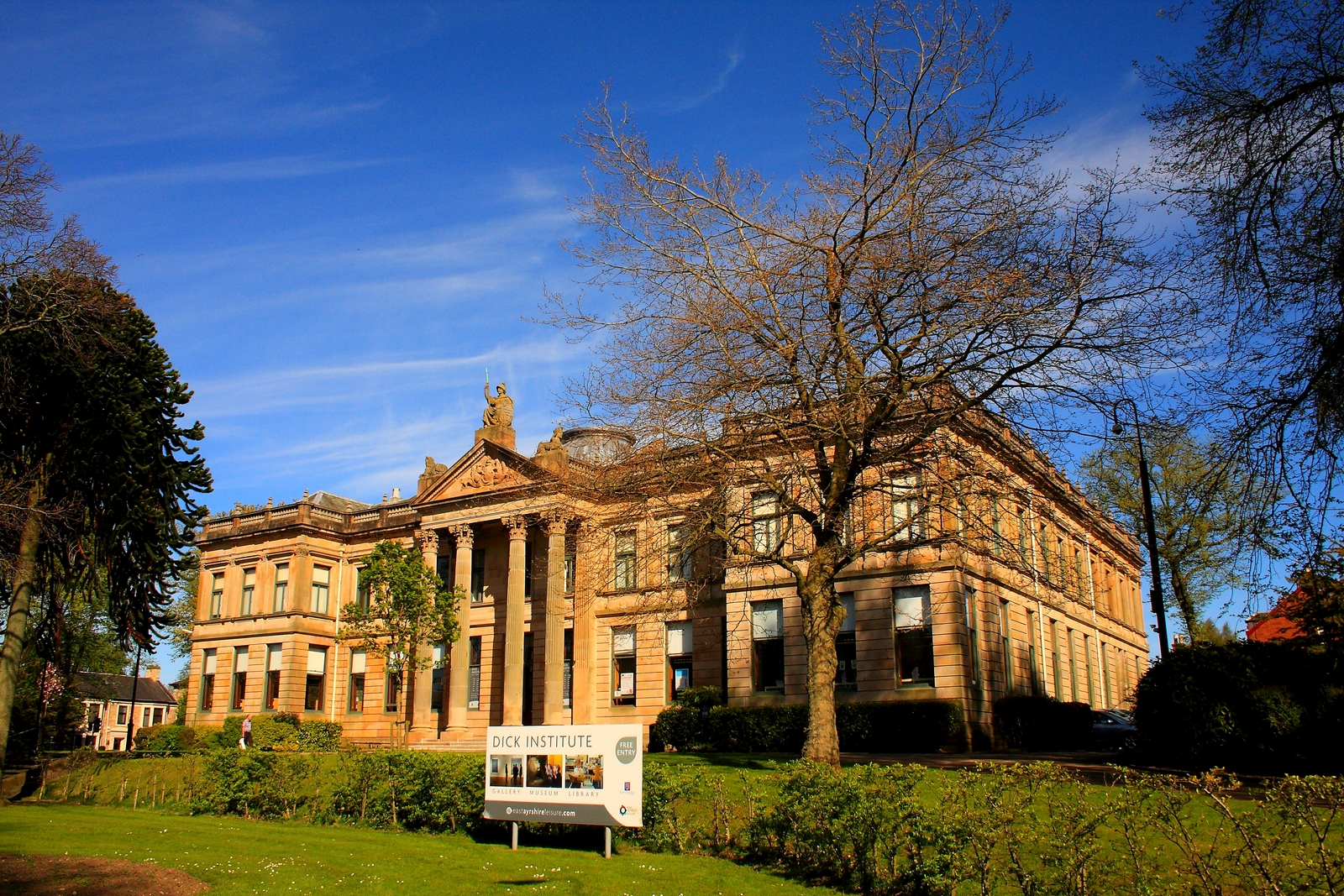
- The Dick Institute front elevation (2017)
- Established: 1901; 125 years ago
- Location: Elmbank Avenue, Kilmarnock, East Ayrshire, Scotland
- Coordinates: 55.60835°N 4.48972°W
- Type: Visitor attraction, museum and library
- Collections: Historical artefacts concerning Kilmarnock and its history
- Visitors: 130,000 per annum
- Founder: James Dick
- Owner: East Ayrshire Council
- Website: Dick Institute

The Dick Institute is a public library, museum and art gallery situated in Kilmarnock, East Ayrshire, in the west coast of Scotland. The building was originally opened in 1901 and has been recognised as a 4-star tourist attraction by VisitScotland.

After only eight years of the building being open to the public, a serious fire engulfed the Dick Institute, with many of the items on display at the time of the fire being destroyed, however, many of the paintings were salvaged by staff who carried them from the building as they evacuated. It was reconstructed in the following years, and by World War I, it was serving as an auxiliary hospital before being reconverted into a library and museum following the war.

Today, the Dick Institute is recognised as an important cultural venue in the south-west of Scotland, featuring the largest museum and art gallery space in Ayrshire as well as the central library for East Ayrshire. The Dick Institute has been described as "Scotland’s finest municipal gallery".

== History ==
=== Opening ===
The Dick Institute was opened in 1901. The funds which were required to build the institute were provided by James Dick, who lived in Australia but was born in 1823, in Soulis Street, Kilmarnock. The building was severely damaged by fire only eight years after it opened. Some of the museum's collections were lost in the fire but it reopened in 1911 and was used as an auxiliary hospital in 1917 during World War I.

=== Present day ===
The Dick Institute has a programme that includes nationally important exhibitions, permanent displays of the museum's own collections and work by contemporary artists, film makers and young people from the area, giving the Dick Institute a growing reputation for the quality and scope of its exhibitions and events. Previous major exhibitions have included Miffy, Quentin Blake, Wallace and Gromit, Cutting Edge, Radical Nature and Bill Viola.

Many of Scotland's leading contemporary artists including Kenny Hunter, Simon Ward and Christine Borland have been shown and creative commissioning programmes have supported artistic talent, by linking with major shows such as Ayrshire Innovators, Creative Burns and South By South West. The South Museum and Loom Room feature stories of the local and social history of the area as well as a Johnnie Walker display featuring a selection of illustrations and objects from the company and from the institute's own collections.

The North Museum wing contains objects from the natural history sciences and archaeology collections which have been recently updated and refurbished to display more items, including some previously unseen by the public from the museum stores. The lending library, junior library, learning centre and cafe are all housed on the ground floor. Full disabled access is available.

== Galleries ==
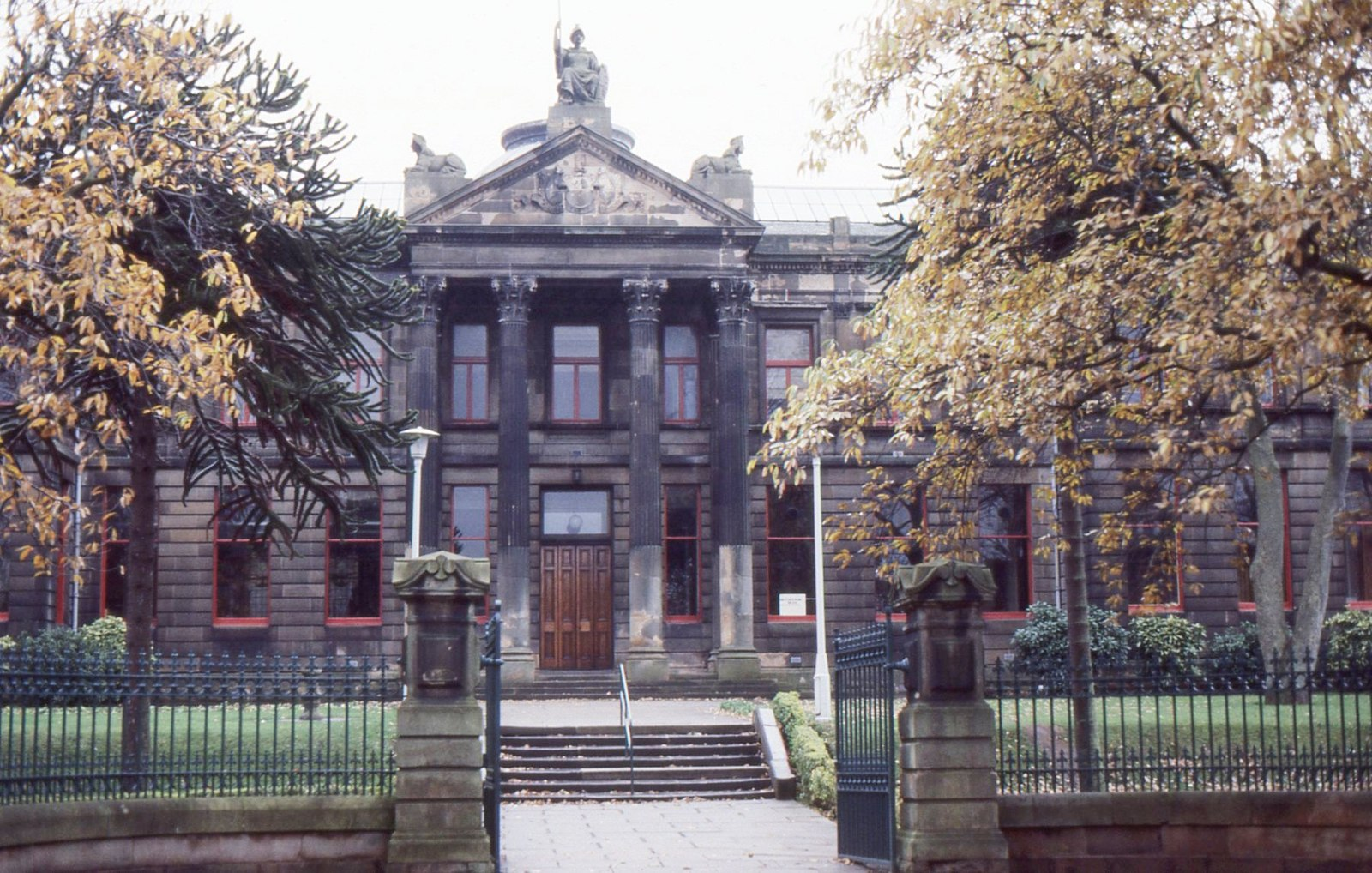
Front elevation in 1984

The Main Gallery of the Dick Institute is home to various touring exhibitions which is made possible with the museums partnerships with national institutions including TATE, the Design Museum, National Galleries Scotland, the Victoria and Albert Museum and Seven Stories. Notable exhibitions to have been displayed at the Dick Institute in the Main Gallery include Quentin Blake, Gerhard Richter, Michael Morpurgo, Bricktropolis (Lego), Miffy and Wallace and Gromit. The Dick Institute also exhibits temporary exhibitions from "Scotland’s leading contemporary visual artists", and has featured works from Christine Borland, Nathan Coley, Kenny Hunter, Rachel Maclean and Graham Fagen as well as works by artists Simon Ward and Timorous Beasties.

The museum galleries within the Dick Institute showcase semi-permanent exhibitions which are culturally and historically significant to East Ayrshire. A replica of John Wilson’s printing press is on display in the gallery, which was responsible for printing the first book of Robert Burns poems, Poems, Chiefly in the Scottish Dialect, commonly known as The Kilmarnock Edition. Original Burns manuscripts which are on rotation also feature and include Burns works such as Tam O’Shanter, The Twa Dogs and The Cottar’s Saturday Night. The gallery also features an array of historical items commemorating Johnnie Walker whisky which was established in Kilmarnock in 1820.

== Visitors ==
The Dick Institute exhibitions within the museums attracts in excess of 130,000 visitors per year, with a further 4,700 participating in events and workshops which are organised by the Dick Institute.
