= Fullarton =

Urban are in Ayrshire, Scotland

Coordinates: 55.609°N 4.667°W

- Location within North Ayrshire
- OS grid reference: NS3209838310
- Council area: North Ayrshire
- Lieutenancy area: Ayrshire and Arran
- Country: Scotland
- Sovereign state: United Kingdom
- Post town: Irvine
- Postcode district: KA11, KA12
- Dialling code: 01294
- Police: Scotland
- Fire: Scottish
- Ambulance: Scottish
- UK Parliament: Central Ayrshire
- Scottish Parliament: Cunninghame South

Fullarton is a urban area in Irvine, North Ayrshire. It is situated close to Irvine Bay and is next to several industrial estates, large supermarkets and retail stores and the town centre itself. Stagecoach Western buses operate the local bus services in the area. Fullarton is only 8 miles from Prestwick Airport and 25 miles from the city of Glasgow.

Fullarton has a national cycling route nearby. Route 7 is popular with locals walking/cycling to nearby towns such as Ardrossan, Troon and Ayr. The Irvine New Town Trail is also close by. The trail circles the town, passing through Bourtreehill, Girdle Toll, Eglinton Park and Kilwinning. It also forms part of the British National Cycle Network, passing through routes 7 and 73.

The main road through Fullarton is Ayr Road, connecting Fullarton to Western Gailes and Irvine Town Centre. The New Bailey Bridge or 'Fullarton Arches' provides access to other areas of Irvine and the dual carriage way leading to Kilmarnock and on-wards to Glasgow. There are many amenities which the locals use, including many large supermarkets.

== Schools ==
- Loudon Montgomery Primary

There is only one primary school in the Fullarton area due to small numbers of primary pupils. All pupils move on to Irvine Royal Academy after finishing their primary years.

== Local amenities, public houses and restaurants ==
- Taco Bell
- Chinese
- Tesco fuel station
- Burger King
- Tesco Extra store
- Frankie & Benny's restaurant and bar
- KFC
- Asda
- Marks & Spencer
- McDonald's
- Sainsbury's
- Farmfoods

Both the Tesco, Sainsburys and Asda stores have automated teller machines which are free to use. Due to being so close to Riverway Retail Park, Fullarton has many shops and restaurants on its doorstep. The railway station and Rivergate Shopping Mall are both less than a five-minute walk from Fullarton.

== Transport ==
Bus services are operated by Stagecoach West Scotland and Shuttle Buses.

- 11 Kilmarnock - Ardrossan I
- 14 - Perceton - Ayr (Mon - Fri Mornings)
- 14A - Irvine Cross - Troon
- 21 - Irvine Harbour - Crosshouse Hospital (Mon - Fri Mornings)
- 22 - Montgomerie Park -Irvine Railway Station (Mon - Fri Mornings & Evenings)
- 22A - Redburn / Castlepark - Irvine Industrial Estate (Mon - Fri Mornings)
- 28 - Broomlands / Bourtreehill - Irvine Railway Station / Tesco (Mon - Sat Mornings / Afternoons)
- 38 - Riverway Retail Park - Kilwinning (Mon - Sat)
- X34 - Glasgow - Irvine Railway Station (Mon - Fri Mornings & Mon - Sat Afternoons)

== River Irvine ==
The River Irvine runs past the side of Fullarton. The river is known for having a good supply of fish during the fishing season and is popular with locals wishing to fish there. The river is slightly polluted but not too badly.

== History ==
Fullarton historically belonged to the Parish of Dundonald. In 1707 Queen Anne conferred Burgh of Barony status on Fullarton. It would be 1838 before Fullarton Church was established as a Chapel of Ease to Dundonald Parish Church. It would be c.1874 before Fullarton was raised to full parish status. However, birth death and marriage certificates would continue to record events in Fullarton as occurring in the 'Parish of Dundonald' until after 1908.

The main street of Fullarton is now known as Montgomery Street ~ but was originally known as The Halfway. Number 26 (now demolished) was the birthplace of James Montgomery the Christian hymn writer. In 1882 The Halfway was renamed Montgomery Street in honour of James Montgomery.

The provisions of the Irvine Burgh Act 1881 incorporated Fullarton into the Royal Burgh of Irvine. In 1972 and 1973 large parts of Fullarton were cleared in preparation for the Rivergate Mall development arising from New Town status for Irvine. This included the demolition of the old Bridge in summer 1973. The original proposals for the Rivergate Mall was to develop a shopping centre over four phases. Phase One was opened in October 1975. This phase also included Cunninghame House. In reality Phases Two to Four have never been built and it appears that the plans have been abandoned.

Phase Two would have seen the westwards extension of the shopping centre towards Irvine Railway Station. Phase Three would have seen the replacement of the Railway Station. Phase Four would have entailed the demolition of the surviving half of Montgomery Street to permit the shopping centre to connect with the Magnum.

== Local celebrations ==
On the second Saturday after the first Monday in August, there is a parade in the Fullarton area to celebrate Mary Queen of Scots visiting Irvine many years ago. The Fourth Port Parade was formed when the Marymass parade was unable to reach the area due to the pedestrian only Rivergate Mall being built over an old vehicle bridge. The parade is the week before the major Marymass parade and spend 3 hours marching around the streets of Fullarton before finishing at the Low Green Park. The parade consists of the Marymass Queen, the Marymass captain, many horses and carts, horse-drawn floats and bands including pipers.

== See also ==
- Annick Water
- River Irvine
- Bourtreehill House
- Eglinton Castle
- Eglinton Country Park
- Irvine New Town Trail
