= Lands of Broomlands =

Coordinates: 55.610582°N 4.630512°W

Broomlands or Broumlands
- Location within Scotland
- OS grid reference: NS 34393 38351
- Shire county: Ayrshire
- Country: Scotland
- Sovereign state: United Kingdom
- Police: Scotland
- Fire: Scottish
- Ambulance: Scottish

The lands of Broomlands or Broumlands formed a small country estate about a mile to the east of Irvine, North Ayrshire, Scotland situated on the east bank of the Annick Water in the Parishes of Dreghorn and Irvine.

== History ==
The spelling 'Broomlands' and 'Montgomery' is used throughout for consistency. The name may derive from the common shrub Broom or Cytisus scoparius that is plentiful in the area to this day. Roy's map of 1747 clearly marks two properties as 'Broom Land' and 'Broom Lands' and John Thomson's map of 1832 marks 'East, Nether and Over Broomlands. Armstrong's map of 1775 records a 'Bloomly' to the north of the Annick and a 'Broomland' to the south, as well as 'Lockwards' to the west and 'Cherylands' to the east.

=== The lairds of Broomlands ===
In 1596 John Peebles of Broomlands died and is recorded as having been a merchant burgess and also Provost of Irvine at the time of his death. He was buried in Irvine Old Parish cemetery. John's father was Robert Peebles, baillie and burgess of Irvine who died 16 September 1605. Patrick Peebles of 'Brumelands' inherited the property. John Peebles was succeeded by his daughter Mariote Peebles.

Hugh Montgomery of Stane, Auchinhood and Bowhouse lived at Broomlands and his wife Margaret Calderwood of Peacockbank were buried in the Irvine Old Parish cemetery and it is recorded on their memorial that he died aged 92 in November 1658; George Montgomery of Broomlands, their second son, died aged 86 on 6 May 1700. George's spouses were Anna Barclay of Perceton and Margaret Wallace of Shewalton. Hugh, son of George through his first marriage died aged 83 on 3 December 1728 in the 55th year of his marriage to Jean Brown. Jean herself died aged 83 on 8 December 1728.

Robert Montgomery, son of the aforementioned George and Jean let the side down and died aged 68, however his brother Hugh restored the family's reputation for longevity and died aged 80 on 24 February 1766. Hugh had been the Provost of Campbeltown in Argyll and Bute.

Charles Montgomery of Broomlands inherited, however he sold the estate and died in the 1780s unmarried after a career as a merchant burgess in Glasgow.

Jean Montgomerie was Charles's eldest sister and she married Henry Eccles of the excise.

Robert Hamilton of Bourtreehill held Broomlands before the property was acquired by Archibald Montgomerie, 13th Earl of Eglinton, his great-grandson.

=== Family history ===
Charles Montgomery of Broomlands believed that he was a male heir of the Eglinton line of the Montgomery family with precedency over the Lainshaw branch and employed Mr Dickie of Kilmarnock to produce a family tree of such a size that stretchers of wood were needed when it was opened.

The Montgomery of Assloss family were a cadet branch of the Montgomerys of Broomland, however this line ended with an heiress, Jane Montgomery who married James Sommerville of Kennox near Stewarton.

Robert Montgomery of Broomlands, a banker, represented the line of the Hammils of Roughwood through his great-grandfather Robert Montgomery of Craighouse who had married Anna Hammil. Robert Montgomery of Broomlands married Jane Haldane, granddaughter of William Cunninghame of Lainshaw.

=== The estate ===
The lands of Broomlands consisted of the 'Little, Upper or Over Broomlands' and 'Nether Broomlands'. East Broomlands and Broomlands Cottage are also recorded, however inclusion within the estate is not clear. Fencedyke and old Hiemyre was sold by Irvine Council to Montgomerie of Broomlands at an unspecified date.

The 1856 OS map shows Nether Broomlands with farm-like outbuildings and a 'superior' dwelling facing an ornate garden with eight parterre-like beds that are absent by 1805, by which time the nearby coal pit No.7 is in operation with the associated freight railway to Dreghorn station.

A route from Nether Broomlands to Over Broomlands is clearly shown with a ford located near to Nether Broomlands with a link over the Busbie Branch of the G&SWR to the Templelands Irvine Road. A lime kiln was situated near East Broomlands.

=== Broomlands in 2014 ===
Broomlands House and old farms have been demolished and the fields now form part of the green space next to the Broomlands housing scheme, Broomlands busway, Sustrans cycle routes, etc.

=== The Broomlands Collieries, coal pits and clay pits ===
Coal was being mined and exported from Irvine harbour as early as 1791. In 1856 a Broomlands Coal Pit was located near Annickbank on the Templelands to Irvine Road, closed by 1895. By 1908 coal pits near Nether Broomlands were disused, as was Broomlands Coal Pit No.7., however the Broomlands Miners Rows on Station Brae at Dreghorn are still present and Broomlands Coal Pit No.8 was still operational.

In 1886 the Bourtreehill Coal Company extended its Broomlands No.9 Pit to work under Newmoor, however by 1928 production had ceased.

While 'shanking' (or sinking a shaft for a coal mine) was in progress in the Irvine area, clay was brought in from Broomlands when 'motting the shank' or sealing the shaft was necessary due to the shaft being cut through sand.

== Micro-history ==
The Irvine Town Council accounts for January 1686 record that the town magistrates met with the lairds of Perceton, Old Broomlands, Bryce Blair, clerk and others and were supplied with generous refreshments, namely five pints of wine, tobacco and pipes.

== See also ==
- Broomlands - The housing scheme.
- Bourtreehill - The housing scheme.
- Bourtreehill House
- Towerlands, North Ayrshire
