= Irvine New Town Trail =

Trail in North Ayrshire, Scotland

Coordinates: 55°38′40″N 4°39′47″W

The Irvine New Town Trail is a recreational cycleway and footpath around Irvine, North Ayrshire, Scotland. The route is 19 kilometres (12 mi) long. The trail is used by many dog walkers and cyclists in the area.

The route forms a ring with no specific start and end points. Taken in a clockwise direction from the town's main Rivergate Centre, the trail runs beside the River Irvine through Irvine's Low Green, continues north beside the railway line past the Towns Moor and the Garnock Floods wildlife reserve, then goes along beside the River Garnock towards Kilwinning's Woodwynd and Blacklands area. At this point, it diverges from the Ayrshire Coastal Path, crossing the river along the route of the former Doura colliery branch line of the Ardrossan Railway before following the Lugton Water eastwards through Eglinton Country Park: a very popular area for recreational activities, with historical interest at Eglinton Castle.

The trail rejoins the disused Ardrossan Railway line at Sourlie Wood nature reserve, and follows the old track south through Girdle Toll in a cutting which formerly led to the Perceton colliery. The trail then runs beside the Annick Water, initially southwards through parkland and countryside to the east of Bourtreehill. It follows the river west in parkland between Broomlands and Dreghorn, using the disused Glasgow, Paisley, Kilmarnock and Ayr Railway trackbed past the site of the former Dreghorn railway station, then rejoins the River Irvine riverbank heading north back to the Rivergate shopping mall.

The route forms part of the national cycle network with routes 7 and 73 forming part of the route.
