= Greenwood Academy, Dreghorn =

Greenwood Academy
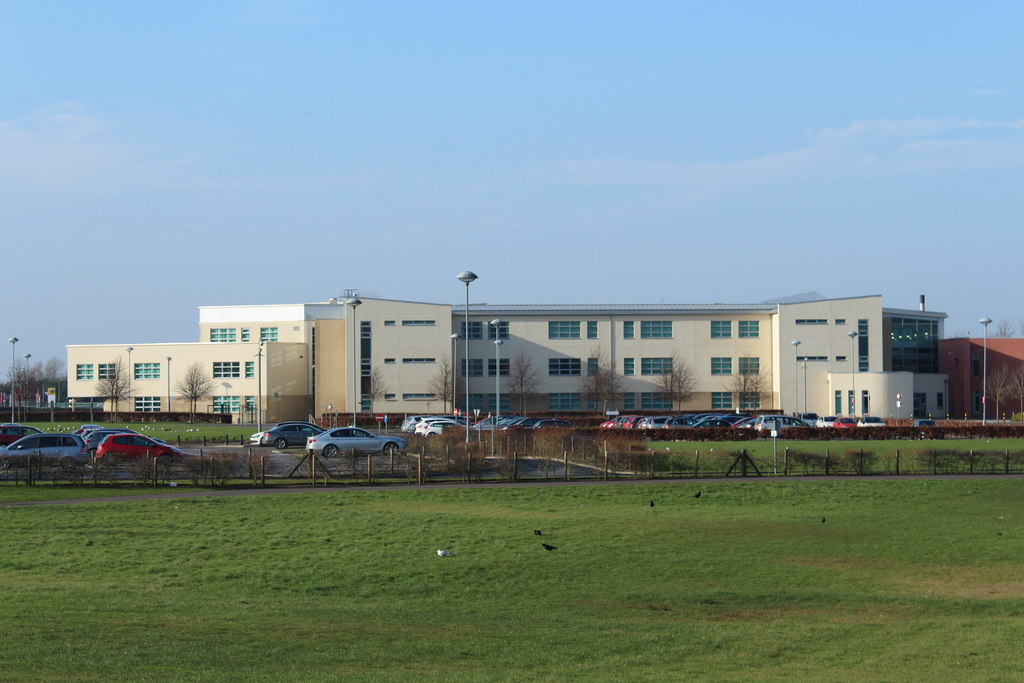
- School badge Greenwood Academy building in February 2017

Location
- Corsehillmount Road; Dreghorn, North Ayrshire, KA11 4HL; Scotland; 55.6083°N 4.6330°W

Information
- Type: 11–18 State secondary school
- Motto: Aye to Learn
- Established: 1972
- Local authority: North Ayrshire Council
- Head teacher: Katy Hegarty
- Staff: 101.6 FTE
- Gender: Boys and girls
- Age range: 11–18
- Enrolment: 1,376 (2022–2023)
- Houses: Annick; Broomlands; Gailes; Montgomery; Overtoun; Perceton; Shewalton; Warrix
- Colour
- Website: Greenwood Academy blog

Greenwood Academy is an 11–18 state secondary school in Dreghorn, North Ayrshire, Scotland. Between 2019 and 2020, the pupil roll was 1,263 with an average attendance rate of 88.47%. By 2022–2023, the enrolment at the school increased to 1,367 pupils. The current Head Teacher, Katy Hegarty, is supported by four Depute Head Teachers and a staffing complement of 101.6 full time equivalent (FTE) teaching and non–teaching staff.

== History ==
The school opened in August 1972, serving the areas of Dreghorn, Springside, Bourtreehill, Broomlands and the outer areas of Irvine such as Montgomerie Park, Perceton and Lawthorn since moving into the reconstructed building in October 2008. Greenwood Academy has a total of five associated primary schools – Elderbank, Glebe, Dreghorn, Lawthorn and Springside Primary School, with the school also accept placing requests from other primary schools both within and outwith North Ayrshire.

There has been a total of four Head Teachers of Greenwood Academy since it was established in 1972 – William "Bill" Cochrane (1972–1987), Phillip Galbraith (1987–2004), Christine McGuire (2004–2019) and incumbent, Katy Hegarty (2019–present).

== Overview ==
=== Curriculum and attainment ===
The school provides tuition in the subjects required by the Curriculum for Excellence, including English, mathematics, sciences, health and well-being, ICT, modern languages, religious and moral education, performance and design. Extra curricular activities include drama, music, chess and a variety of sports.

Greenwood Academy's "positive destinations" post-school is frequently ranked as the highest in the North Ayrshire area and also consistently above the Scottish national average. In June 2022, most pupils attending Greenwood Academy achieved Curriculum for Excellence third level or higher in literacy by the end of their Third year, with most pupils attending the school also achieving the same level within numeracy. From 2016 to 2019, Greenwood Academy was above the North Ayrshire average in Writing, Reading, Listening and Talking, however, by 2021, the school had fallen below the local authority average in these areas.

From 2016 however, Greenwood Academy's Numeracy trends continue to be above the North Ayrshire average, with the school achieving 85.1% in 2021 against the local authority average of 82.1%.

=== Attendance ===
In 1996, Greenwood Academy began piloting a "state of the art" computerised system to track pupils in an attempt to reduce levels of pupils not attending school. The pilot project, which ran between 1996 and 1997, was dubbed successful, and became "a centre of excellence" in which BBC News said "other schools interested in the system can learn from". As part of the project, attendance rolls were logged electronically with a second computer system being implemented which tracked pupils who had received punishment exercises or who had arrived at classes late. The system also implemented a reward system whereby pupils would receive merits for their class work and efforts. Following the pilot, truancy rates at Greenwood Academy decreased from 15% to 9%.

Following the outbreak of the COVID-19 pandemic in Scotland, Greenwood Academy saw a decline in pupil attendance in 2021 and required to provide further support for pupils in order to increase attendance levels. The school was awarded over £50,000 from the Scottish Government as part of the Pupil Equity Fund which funded an awareness campaign launched by Greenwood Academy with parents and carers in order to highlight the implications of low attendance on learning and positive destinations. The school deployed an "Early intervention" approach and became the focus for building strong relationships.

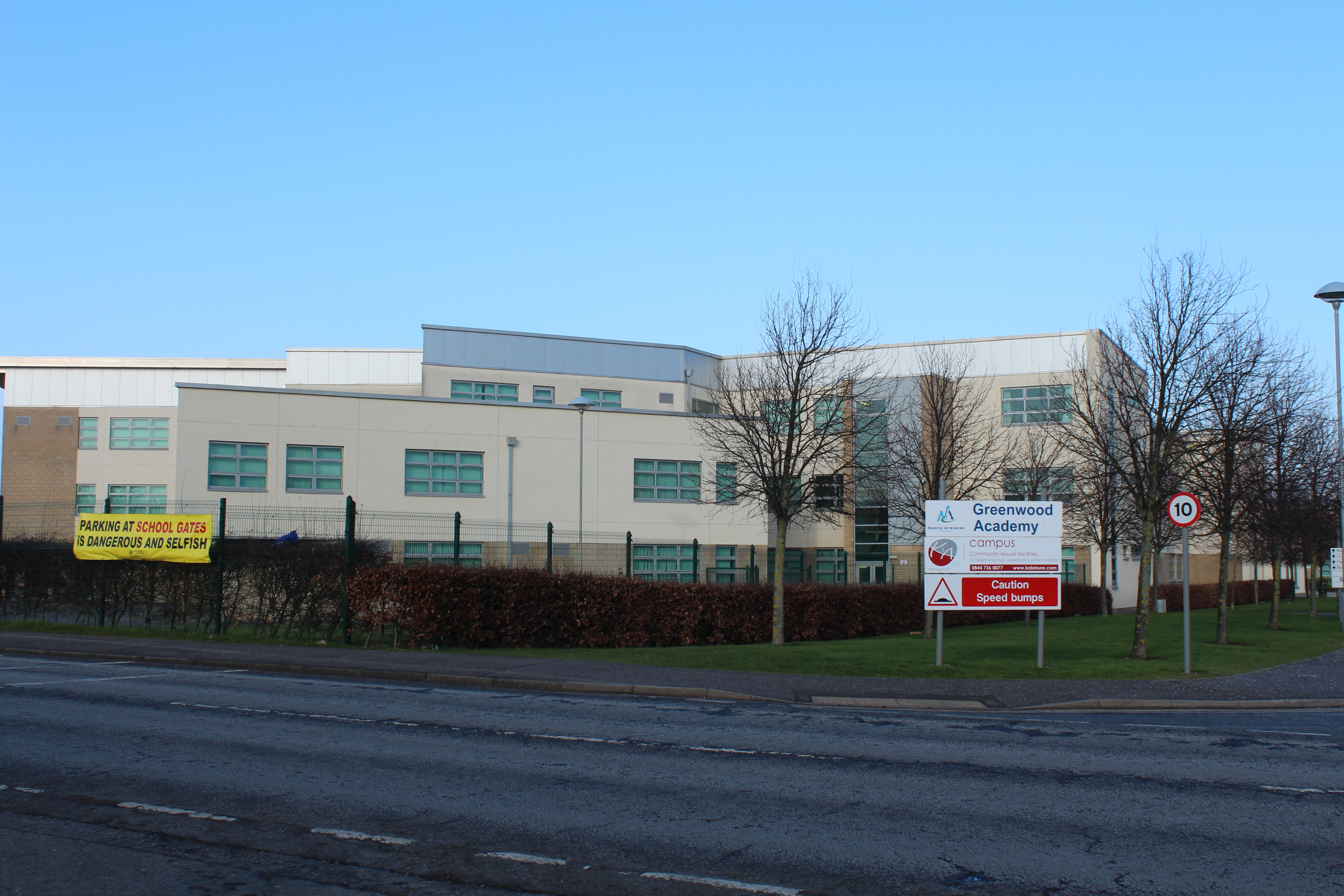
Greenwood Academy in 2017

Attendance at the school improved slightly, however, Greenwood Academy remains below the national average for attendance. Between August 2023–February 2024, attendance at the school stood at 86.31% compared to 85.12% the previous year.

=== House system ===
The school uses a house system, with each pupil placed in one of eight houses: Annick, Broomlands, Gailes, Montgomery, Overtoun, Perceton, Shewalton and Warrix. Each house represents an area in Irvine. Each house has at least one guidance teacher alongside two house captains.

=== Sports ===
The school has two sports halls, a dance studio, a fitness suite, a range of grass pitches and an AstroTurf pitch. Sports offered include badminton, basketball, dance, fitness training, 5-a-side football, football, gymnastics, handball, hockey, netball, volleyball, rounders, short tennis and table tennis.

== Notable alumni ==
- Nicola Sturgeon (former First Minister of Scotland)
