= Disappearance of Sandy Davidson =

1976 missing child case in Scotland

Sandy Davidson
- Born: Sandy Jardine Davidson; 28 May 1972; Ayrshire, Scotland, UK
- Disappeared: 23 April 1976 (aged 3 years); Irvine, North Ayrshire, Scotland, UK
- Status: Missing for 50 years and 20 days
- Parent(s): Phillip and Margaret Davidson

Sandy Jardine Davidson (28 May 1972 – disappeared 23 April 1976) was a Scottish boy who disappeared on 23 April 1976, when he was three years old, while he was playing in the back garden of his house in the Bourtreehill housing estate in Irvine, Ayrshire.

== Background ==
On 23 April 1976, Sandy Davidson was in his garden with his little sister Donna playing with their dog. They were being looked after by their grandparents, who had gone inside the house at the time. The gate flew open, and their dog ran out. Sandy ran out, trying to catch him. His sister Donna says that all she can remember was Sandy motioning for her to go too, but she refused and went into the house to tell their grandparents. The dog returned.

Work ground to a halt on the new building estate nearby to search for Sandy, but nobody has seen him since.

== Subsequent events ==
The case was featured in an episode of the television series Missing Children: Lorraine Kelly Investigates in 2009, but nobody phoned in with information.

A DNA test was carried out in November 2013 on someone who was born around the same time as Sandy and who lived 20 miles away, but he turned out not to be the missing toddler.

In September 2014, the Broomlands Primary School, which was constructed around the time of Sandy's disappearance, was demolished. The police and council refused to excavate the land to search for Sandy.

In February 2015, a surprise new witness emerged who had made contact via the social networking website Facebook, claiming to have been abducted and tortured by a teenage girl at around the same time that Sandy disappeared.

== See also ==
- List of people who disappeared
