= Towerlands, North Ayrshire =

Coordinates: 55.6191°N 4.6294°W

Towerlands or Tourlands
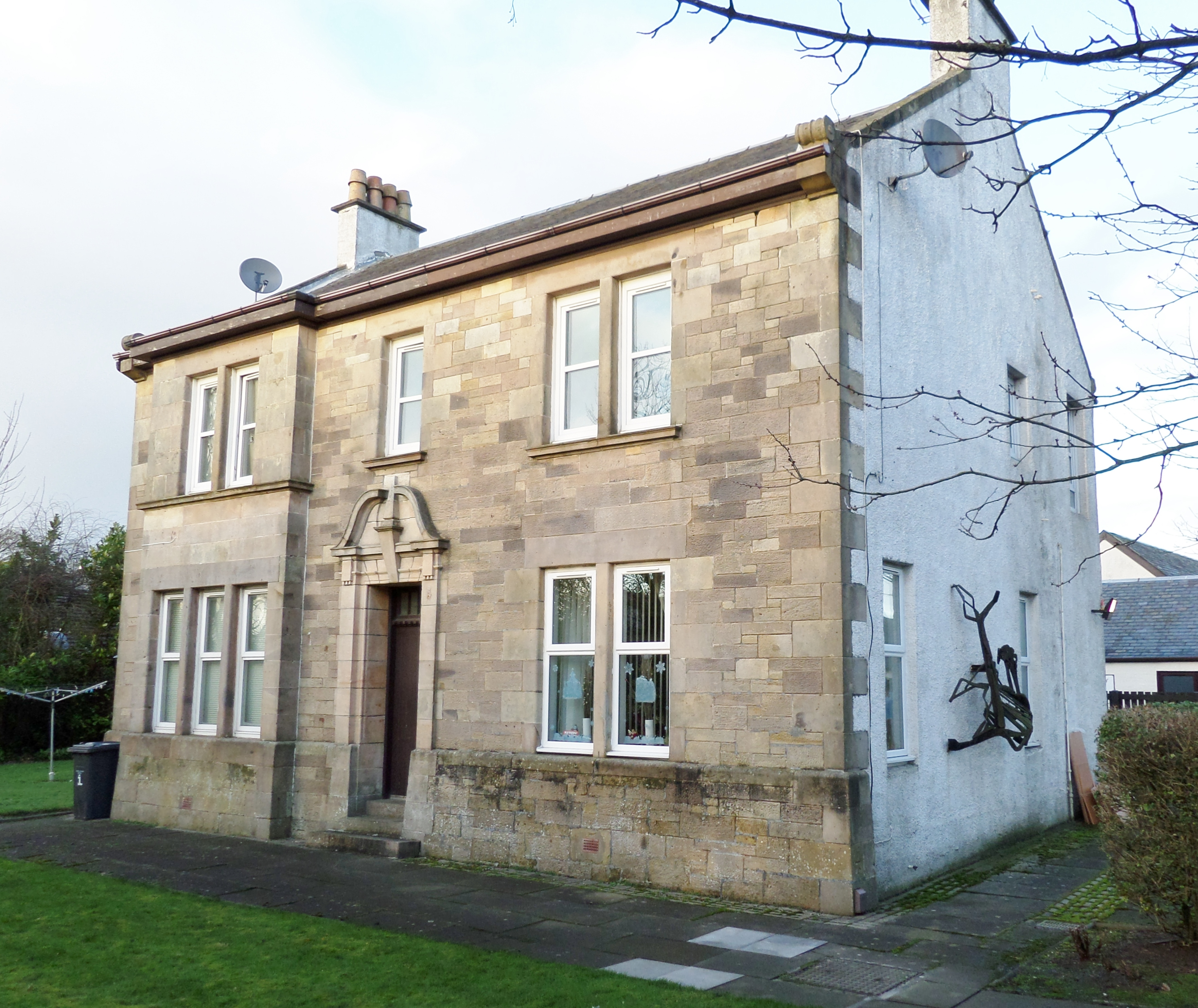
- Towerlands House in 2014

- Location within Scotland
- OS grid reference: NS345392
- District: North Ayrshire
- Shire county: Ayrshire
- Country: Scotland
- Sovereign state: United Kingdom
- Post town: Irvine
- Police: Scotland
- Fire: Scottish
- Ambulance: Scottish

Towerlands or Tourlands was a small estate of 70 to 80 acres (28 to 32 ha) of good quality land in the parish of Irvine and the old barony of Kilmaurs, North Ayrshire, Scotland, situated near the more extensive property of Bourtreehill, the lands of which surrounded it on three sides. The name suggests that a medieval stone or wood 'tower' structure of some sort existed, but no record of this appears to exist.

== History ==
The spelling 'Towerlands' is used throughout for consistency. Roy's map of 1747 clearly marks the lands of Towerlands, and John Thomson's map of 1832 marks 'Tourlands' next to the Bourtreehill estate. Towerlands can be confused with the Tour estate in Kilmaurs, East Ayrshire.

=== The lairds of Towerlands ===
In 1551 a Jasper Templetoun of Towerlands is recorded.

In 1601 a William Cuninghame of Towerlands is recorded; however, he was tried and executed on a charge of treason and all his lands and goods were at the same time forfeited. The 20/- land of Auldtoun-Crosbie had been held by William however it was sold to George Shaw for £1320 in part payment for his spoliation at Cunninghamhead. This included the manor, grain mill, mill lands, waylaid and dams. He had also previously held the 5 Merk lands of Gas and Weltrees in the parish of Auchinleck.

James Hay in 1617 was awarded the superiority of the '40 shilling lands' of Towerlands that belonged to Alexander Cuninghame. James, a servant of the Earl of Glencairn, died in 1639 and his son John inherited the property. This Alexander may have been the brother or a close relation of the William Cuninghame who had been executed for treason.

James Shaw of Balligellie in County Antrim acquired the lands of Towerlands from John Hay, and it then passed to Sir Robert Dickson of Inveresk, who in turn sold the property to William Gemmill, son of the Rev John Gemmill.

The well-respected Rev John Gemmill of Symington was the father of William Gemmill of Towerlands who held the estate in the early 18th century. William's son John then inherited, and the property was passed on to his son William Gemmill in turn, who died unmarried in Jamaica. William's three sisters inherited and then sold the estate to Charles McDowall of Fergushill and Crichan.

Robertson records that Janet, the second daughter of John Gemmill, married George Cuninghame of Monkredding in 1752. The couple had a son and four daughters. Agnes married William Miller of Monkcastle, and Catherine married Thomas Brisbane, the minister of Dunlop, East Ayrshire.

In 1784 Charles McDowall sold the property to an Irvine shipbuilder, John Webb, whose daughter Margaret inherited and passed Towerlands to her cousin John Webb of Liverpool. Patrick Boyle Mure Macreadie of Perceton purchased the property in 1844, and his son Thomas then inherited and held it in the 1860s.

=== Execution of William Cuninghame ===
On 19 December of the year 1601, William Cuninghame of Towerlands was tried on a charge of treason. His brother, Alexander, with a party of hired soldiers, had taken violent possession of the house of Cuninghamehead, in March, 1600. The King had issued written instructions for them to leave the premises; however, they took up arms against the King's commissioners, upon whom they fired hagbuts. Cuninghame of Towerlands was found guilty, having assisted his brother, and was condemned to be beheaded at the market-cross of Edinburgh; all his lands and goods were at the same time forfeited.

Sir James Cunninghame of Glengarnock appeared as a spokesperson on 15 December 1601 for William Cunninghame (note that the spelling of the family name is highly variable) at his trial for treason, and it is noted that during the taking of Cunninghamhead Castle some persons were killed or 'slaughtered'.

=== Towerlands in 2014 ===
The old farm has been converted into the Towerlands Community Centre and associated amenities such as the nurseries pictured below. Towerlands House is in use as rented accommodation (2014).

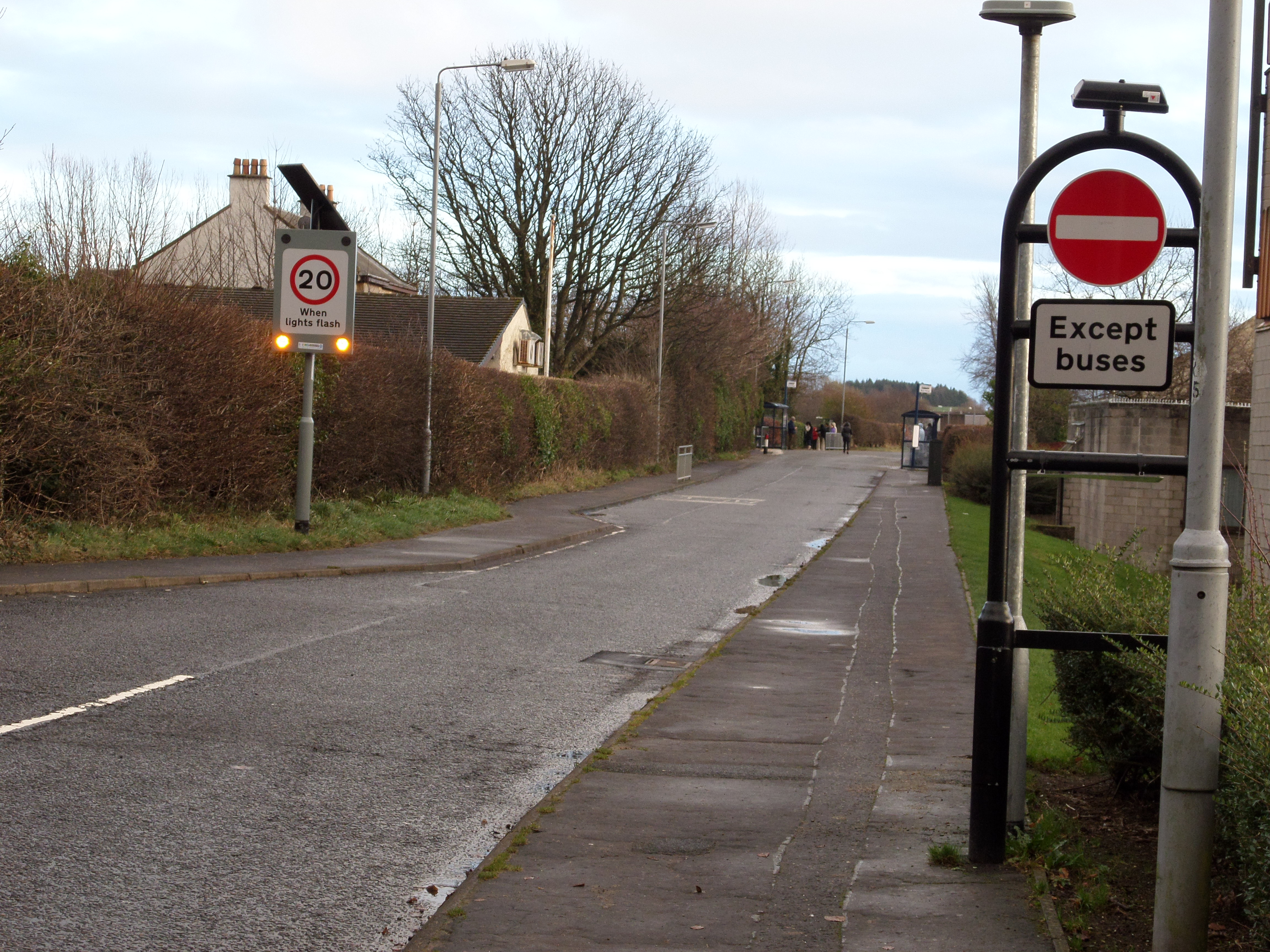
The course of the old Towerlands Tram Road as seen from near Bourtreehill

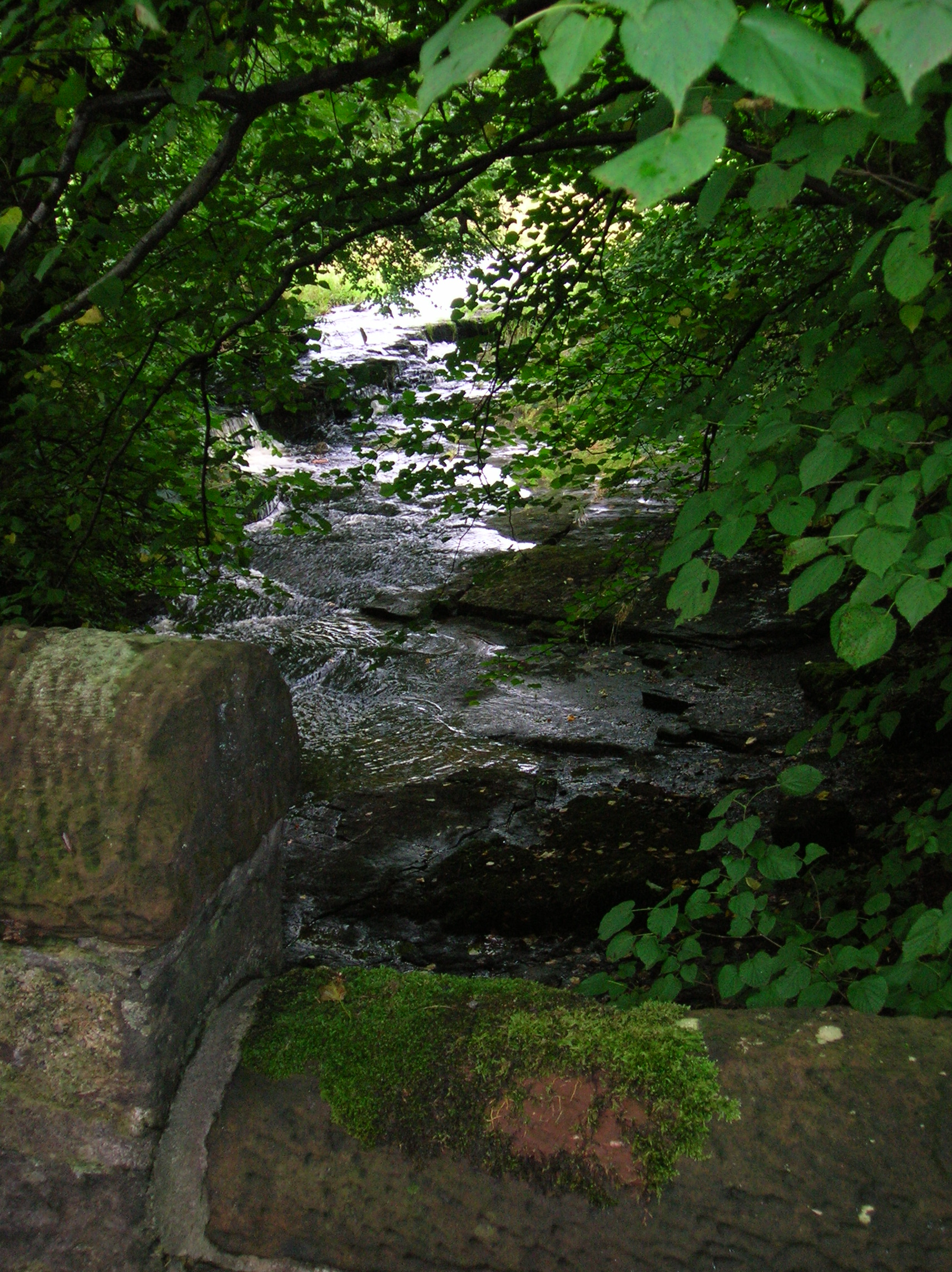
The Dusk Water running after the junction to the old mill race which took the water to the saw mill

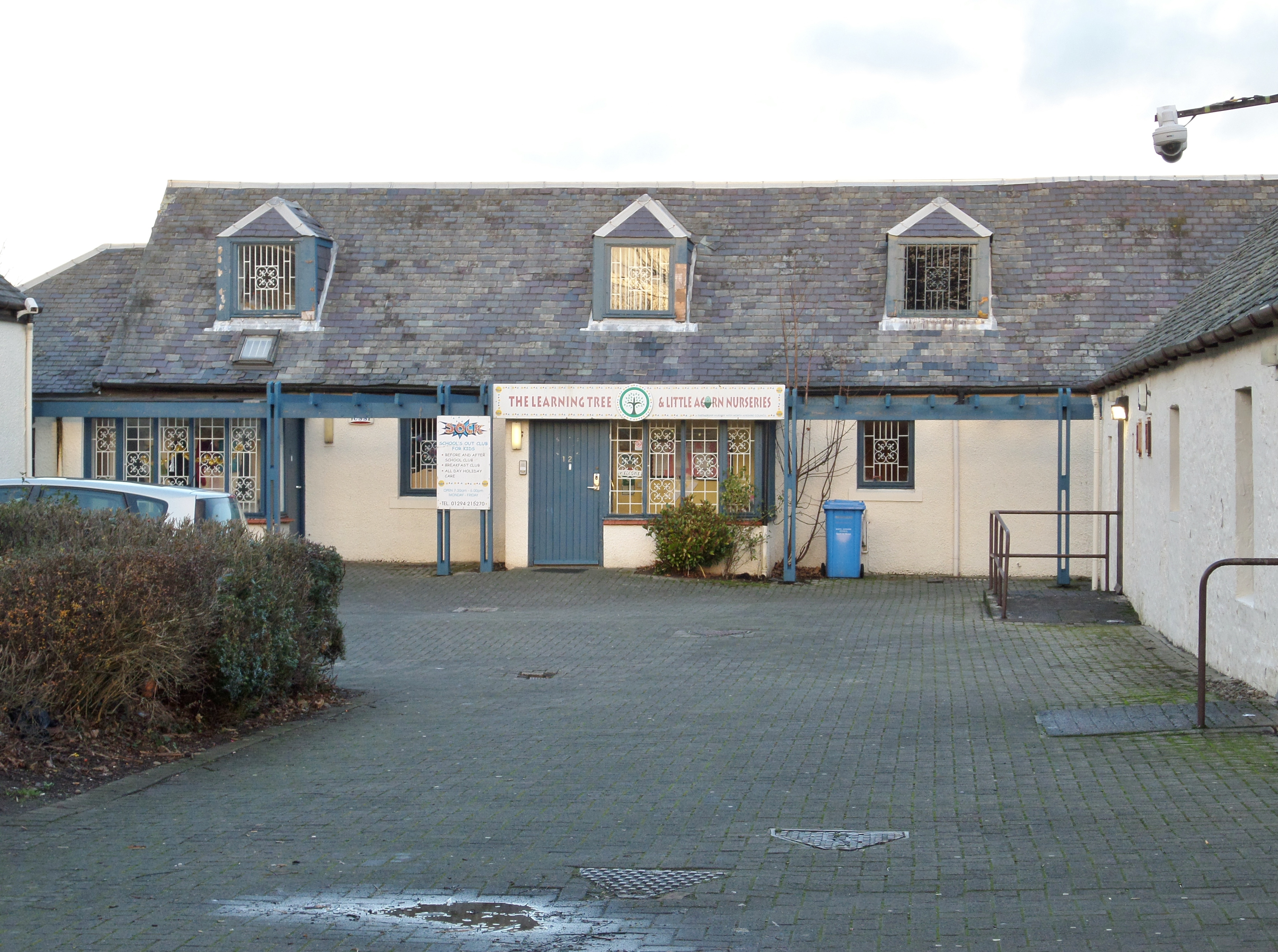
The Old Towerlands Farm

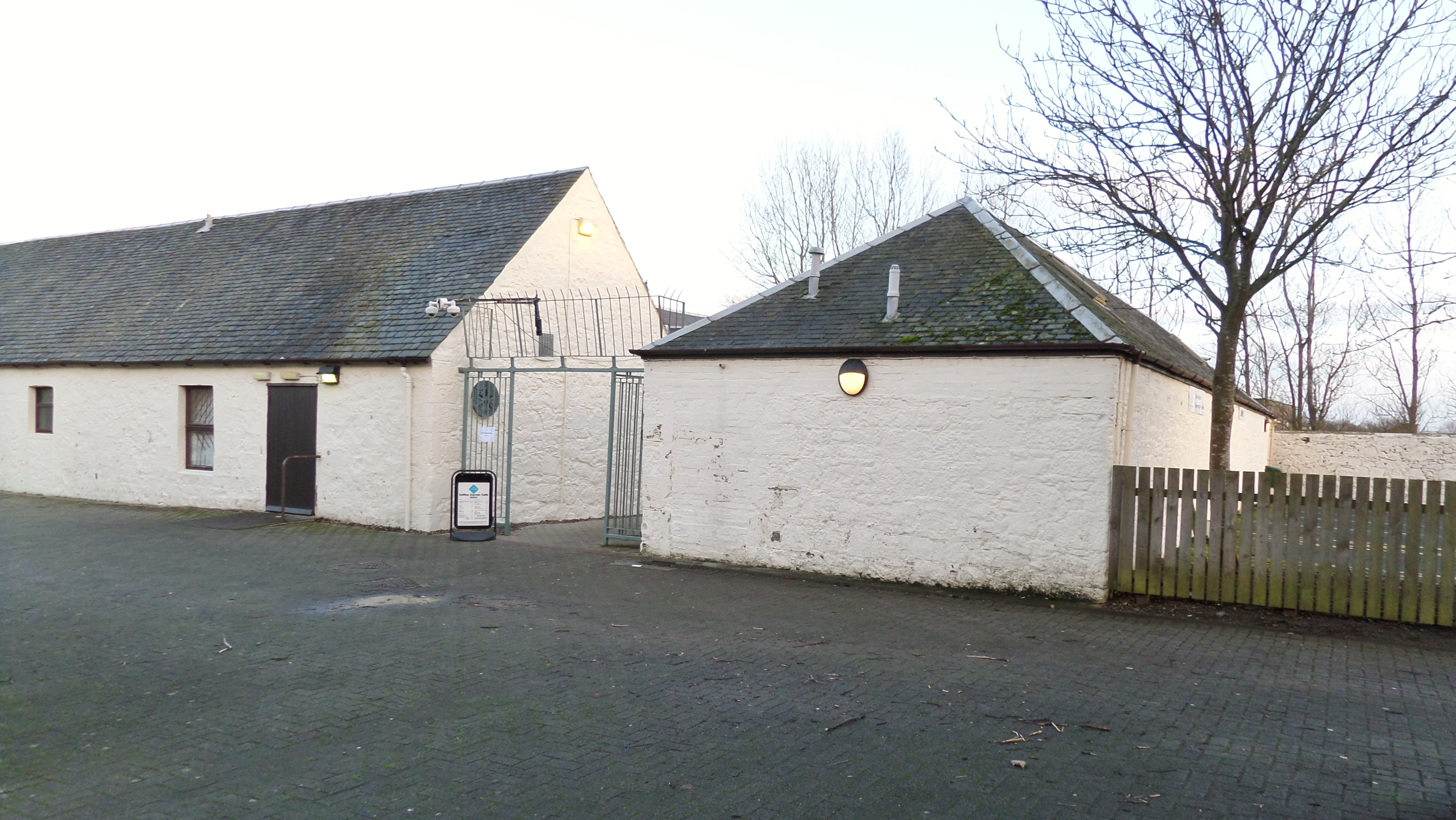
The Towerlands Community Centre and Cafe at the old farm

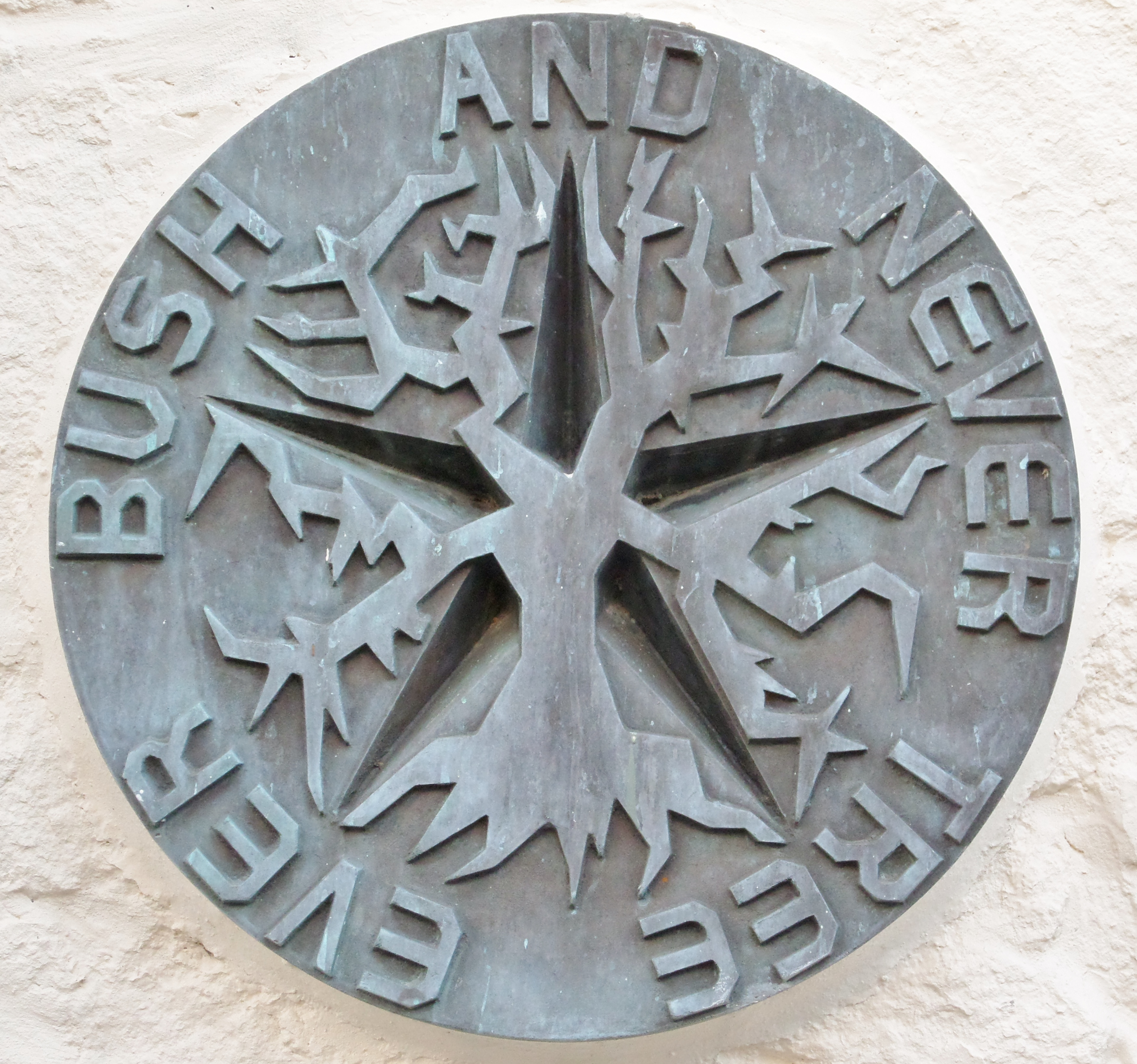
Celebratory plaque at the Towerlands Community Centre Bronze sculpture “Ever Bush and Never Tree” by sculptor, Angie Taylor https://www.angietaylor.co.uk

=== Towerlands Colliery and tram road ===
The Towerlands Tram Road was a 19th-century mineral railway or 'Bogey line' that transported coal, running from the old Towerlands Colliery and associated coal pits near Bourtreehill to Irvine in one direction and to Dreghorn in the other. The branch to Irvine once ran along the side of the road that runs from Dreghorn, past Towerlands and Bourtreehill to Irvine via Mill Road. The tram road was out of use by 1890 following the closure of the colliery.

The colliery offices and stores appear on later maps as Towerlands Cottage.

== Micro-history ==
In 1640 the lands of Towerlands held by John Hay were valued at £126 18s 10d.

The Irvine Town Council accounts for March 1686 record that the town magistrates met with the lairds of Perceton, Corshill, Tourlands and Busbie together with several others and were supplied with generous refreshments, namely three pints and a chapine (half a Scottish pint)) of wine.

In 1862, 25-year-old Alexander Crawford from Towerlands Colliery won the first prize in Glasgow School of Mines And The Society of Arts' Examinations in mining and metallurgy for the Society of Arts' prizes and certificates. Prior to a six-month period of study, he was maintaining his wife and family by hewing coals. His only previous period of formal education was twelve months at a village school.

== See also ==
- Lands of Broomlands
- Lands of Tour and Kirkland
