= Bourtreehill House =

Coordinates: 55°37′19.5″N 4°37′53.0″W

Bourtreehill House (now destroyed) and the enclosed land on which it was built form the original estate of Bourtreehill. The wooded hill-top, a distinctive feature of the estate, is now a landmark that sits at the centre of modern North Bourtreehill in the district of North Ayrshire on the west coast of Scotland.

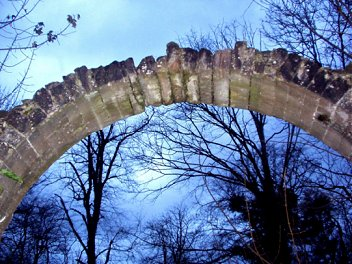
Only Surviving Arch of Bourtreehill

== Physical characteristics ==
Only a mile from the town of Irvine, the remaining land surrounding Bourtreehill House is an overgrown woodland at the summit of a wide but relatively low hill. Medieval in origin and with an array of ruined structures, ancient trees, and overgrown avenues, the estate, which once housed associates of Robert Burns, William Wallace and Lord Byron. That it was once tended by a competent gardener is clear; well defined, though overgrown, garden features are still visible, many of which date back to the mid-18th century.

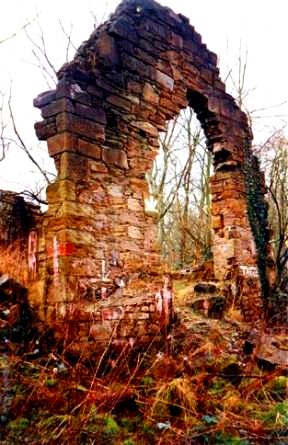
Greatest ruin ten years before collapse

Three antiquated, but currently unidentified, ruined buildings stand deep within the woods of the original estate. In the early 1980s, two arches stood side by side in the northeastern quarter. These are known to have served some purpose involving the coming and going of traffic. The oldest entrance (and subsequently the oldest driveway) once led the visitor directly to the twin arches. Sadly, only one of these fine structures still remains, while the other has been progressively vandalised over the last two decades.

The boundaries of the original medieval estate can still be traced quite easily. During the construction of the modern North Bourtreehill housing scheme, the original confines of the estate were only slightly adjusted. Many houses lie within the ancient interior of Bourtreehill, but those dwellings have been designed in such a way that they complement the undulating land and wooded features. The housing schemes in North Bourtreehill have been described as biomorphic in their style. The River Annick Runs through the area and so adds to the natural surroundings which dominate the North Bourtreehill complex.

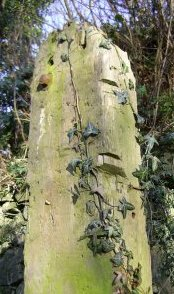
Rare wooden sleeper from Bourtreehill

The land surrounding the estate was peppered by railway lines. An early 19th century railway trackbed can still be followed to the south of Bourtreehill, and a few notably old railway sleepers can be discovered by the highly alert visitor.

== History ==
=== Feudal times ===
The barony was one of the former possessions of the Colt family. Shortly after the Battle of Bannockburn, Robert the Bruce received Bourtreehill from the Colt family. Robert the Steward, the future King Robert II of Scotland is known to have rented Bourtreehill to one Alan of Blair. Roger de Blair of that Ilk had the barony conferred on him by Robert the Bruce. In typical feudal manner, this payment took the form of the all too common Peppercorn rent. This was a valuable Barony, lying partly in the Parish of Irvine and partly in Dreghorn.

Etymology
A 'Bour Tree' is the Ayrshire name for the Common Elder tree, Sambucus nigra, often found in the older and more biodiverse local woodlands.

=== 16th century ===
Montgomery family papers preserved in the Scottish National Archives include a 1505 record of Bourtreehill, or some portion thereof, being owned by a family of Lynns who elsewhere are revealed as being Lords of Lynn in nearby Dalry, the location also of Lynn Glen and Lynn Falls. In 1556, Montgomery family papers reference "John Lyn of that Ilk and Lord of Bourtreehill." The Hunter family papers published by the Scottish Record Society include several 16th-17th century references to Bourtreehill in connection with the Lynns, describing the Lynns as "of that Ilk." Finally, mention of the Lynns in Bourtreehill can be found in a 1608 testament. A partial record of the Lynns of Bourtreehill is as follows:

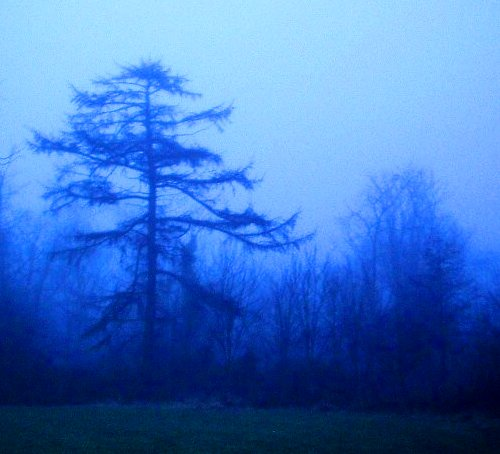
Bourtreehill on a misty Morning

13 Jan 1505 - Andrew Lyne received a charter from Robert Frances, Lord of Stane, for land in Bourtreehill, for which he was to pay to Frances the third part of a whole peppercorn on the feast of St. Martin in winter on the ground of the said lands in name of blench ferm if asked; and to the lords portioners of Peristoun seventeen bolls in measure of oats used and accustomed at two yearly ters St. Martin in winter and Whitsunday by equal portions upon the ground of the said lands. The land consisted of two merks with a half merk of the lands of old extent called Bourtreehill together with two parts of the common, including the three fields lying between the lands called Blakatbank and with a half part of the march lying between the lands of Stayne and the lands called Scottanrig lying in the lordship of Stayne, bailliary of Cunningham and shire of Ayr. The charter was executed in Irvine and is preserved in the papers of the Montgomery family, Earls of Eglinton.

7 Nov 1522 - Robert Hunter resigned lands of Highlees [Dundonald] to John Lyn of Boutrehill.

2 May 1528 - John Lyn of Bowrtrehill witnessed an instrument in Glasgow concerning the Montgomerys.

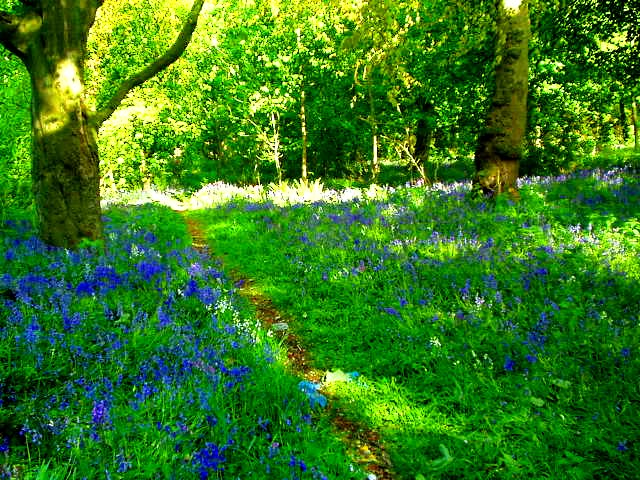
Carpets of Bluebells indicate antiquity

21 Jan 1548 - John Lyn of that Ilk and Bowtrehill conveyed the lands of Highlees to Archibald Crawford as guardian for the heir of Hunterston.

5 Mar 1556 - John Lyn of that Ilk and Lord of Bourtreehill gave sasine in favor of his brother Laurence Lyn, Laurence's spouse Bessie Wallace, and their heirs.

8 Feb 1568 - Laurence Lin of Bourtrehill witnessed an instrument executed by John Lin of that Ilk, superior of Highlees.

8 Oct 1592 - The late Laurence Lin of Bourtrehill was mentioned in an agreement between his widow, Elizabeth Wallace, and William Lin of Bourtreehill, her son, in which William discharged all sums due under certain marriage contracts.

On 17 October 1608, a testament was recorded for Bessie Wallace, deceased spouse of Laurence Lyne in Bourtriehill, Ayrshire. This is the last known reference to Lynns in Bourtreehill. In fact, Bourtreehill had been conveyed two years earlier to the Skelmorlies.

=== 17th & 18th centuries ===
On 18 February 1606, the two merk land and a half of Bourtreehill was conveyed to Robert Montgomery of Skelmorlie, as evidenced by a contract held by the National Archives of Scotland. The house was built in 1682.

In 1685, and 1696 the barony belonged to the Skelmorlie family, from whom it was purchased by Peter Montgomerie, merchant in Glasgow whose son, James Montgomerie, sold it to Robert Hamilton, prior to 1748. Robert Hamilton was born 5 January 1698 and was the eldest son of Hugh Hamilton of Clongall, merchant in Ayr. He and his younger brother, John, ancestor of the Hamiltons of Sundrum, were long resident in Jamaica, where they possessed the estate of Pemberton valley, and acquired very considerable wealth. Robert died 4 June 1773, aged 75. Kilbirnie Place was destroyed by fire early in the morning of 1 May 1757 during building works and never rebuilt. The 19th Earl of Crawfurd, his infant daughter Jean (later a Countess of Eglinton), and domestics had little time to escape. The family moved to Bourtreehill House near Irvine. Lady Crawfurd was the eldest daughter and heiress of Robert Hamilton of Bourtreehill. In 1776 the Countess of Crawfurd is given as proprietor on plate 45 of G. Taylor and A. Skinner's 'Survey and maps of the roads of North Britain or Scotland'.

=== 19th century ===
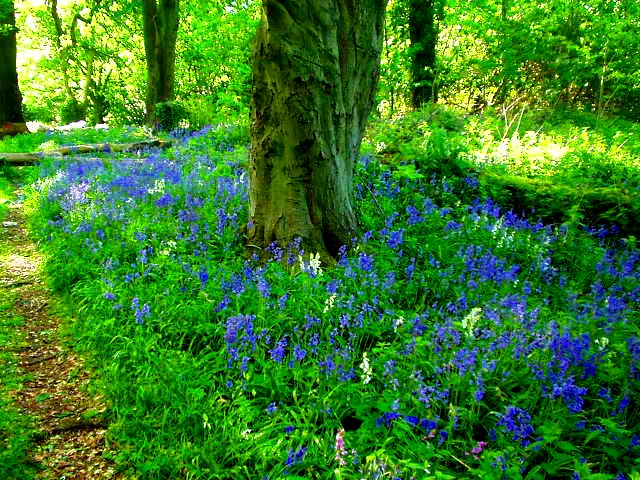
Bourtreehill Bluebells

Robert Hamilton of Rozelle was succeeded by his eldest daughter, the Countess Craufurd, who died 6 October 1809. Her sister, Dame Margaret Hamilton Cathcart, widow of Sir John Cathcart of Carelton, who died in 1785 then succeeded. She died in 1817 and the property devolved upon her nephew, the Earl of Eglinton.

In 1840 the house was altered for Hugh Montgomerie and at this time probably gained a bay window and entrance porch.

Alexander Guthrie of Mount in Kilmarnock purchased Bourtreehill in 1847 and it passed to his daughter, Christina in 1852 (Dobie 1876). Christina married the Hon. D.A.F.Browne, who became Lord Oranmore and Browne in the Peerage of Ireland. Nothing now remains of Bourtreehill House, however remains of outbuildings are still visible. In 1879 Bourtreehill was badly damaged by fire and was restored to the designs of R.S.Ingram.

=== 20th century ===
During the Enlightenment, Bourtreehill housed some of the most important people in the region. The Baron Oranmore and Browne of Bourtreehill House was the grandfather of Tara Browne. In the 18th century, the Earl of Crawford, whose house in Kilbirnie burned to the ground, rescued his wife and daughter and took residence in Bourtreehill House which dated to the early 17th century. It became one of the many great houses lost in the 20th century when it was demolished in the 1960s.

Modern housing estate of Bourtreehill

It is an unfortunate truth that Bourtreehill House, with its preserved Medieval surroundings, is still subject to a certain amount of confusion. Unknown to many Bourtreehillians, the estate is much older than the Bourtreehill which is known today. The date of the inception of Bourtreehill is, as yet, unknown but in the centuries that passed its history has been peppered with a multitude of wealthy, powerful and influential people.

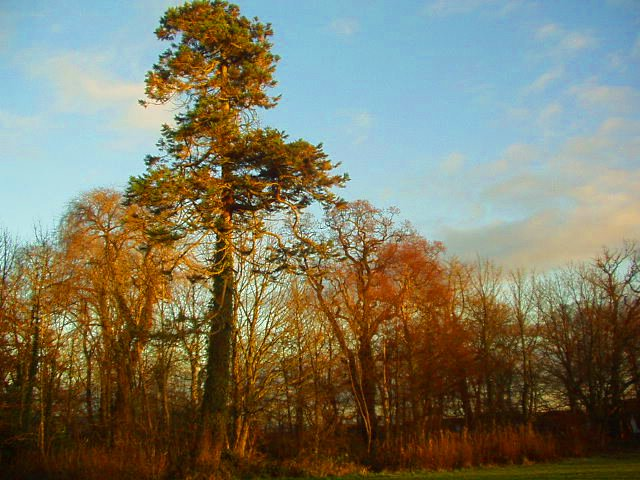
Giant Sequoia in Bourtreehill

Politicians, literary fellows and kings are known to have possessed, rented or visited the estate. That several of those influential historical characters were women is also a valuable and notable point when considering the history of Bourtreehill in the middle-ages and later 17th-18th centuries.

The building became derelict and was demolished in the 1970s, leaving only fragmentary remains of the coach-house and outbuildings.

== Mr. Hamilton of Bourtreehill's gardener ==
Gravestone of Andrew Urquhart

The owner of Bourtreehill in 1754 was one Robert Hamilton. His two daughters married the Earls of Crawford and Eglinton, the latter family later inheriting the entire estate. The Earl of Crawford, who lived in Kilbirnie took his new wife there to live but a devastating fire - from which the Earl rescued his family - brought the house to the ground. The Kilbirnie Earl of Crawford sought shelter and his father-in-law, Robert Hamilton of Bourtreehill, gave his estate to the distressed family. Hamilton moved to another estate he had purchased close by and the Crawford family moved into Bourtreehill House in 1757. The footman employed by the Earl of Crawford had come to Bourtreehill to continue to duties. He later published his works under the name Memoirs of an 18th Century Footman. At the same time, the gardener employed by Robert Hamilton of Bourtreehill, was directly responsible for much of the landscaping and decoration in the present remnant that survives today.

He was a subject in the Letters of Gilbert Burns, a collection of letters written by the brother of Robert Burns. In these, Gilbert reminisces on a book loan between his own father, William Burness and "Mr. Hamilton of Bourtreehill's gardener". The grave of Andrew Urquhart can be seen in Irvine Parish Graveyard.

For additional history and photographs visit the Bourtreehill website by clicking here.

Bourtreehill Estate views (2007)

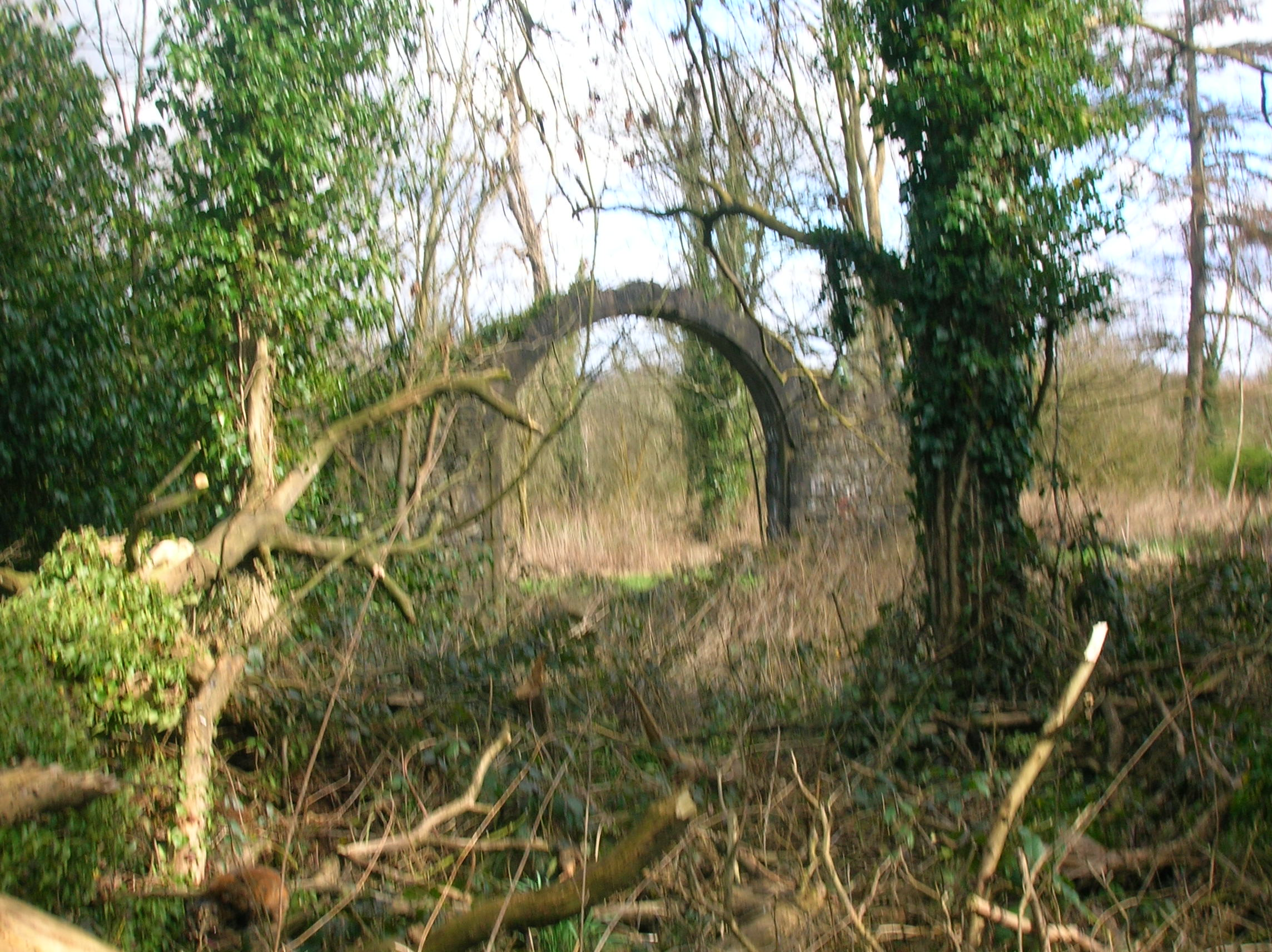
Ruins of estate outbuildings

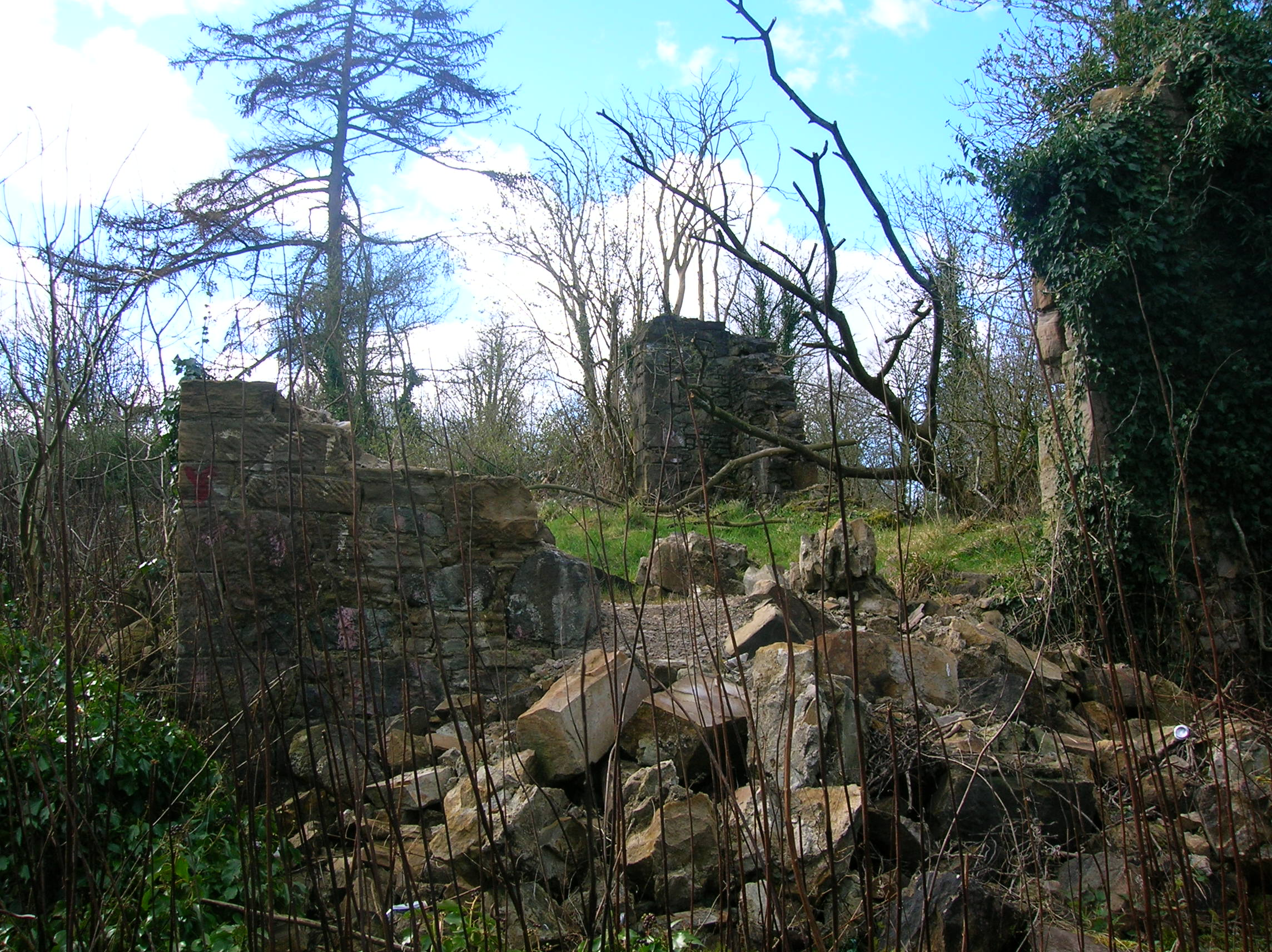
Ruins of estate outbuildings

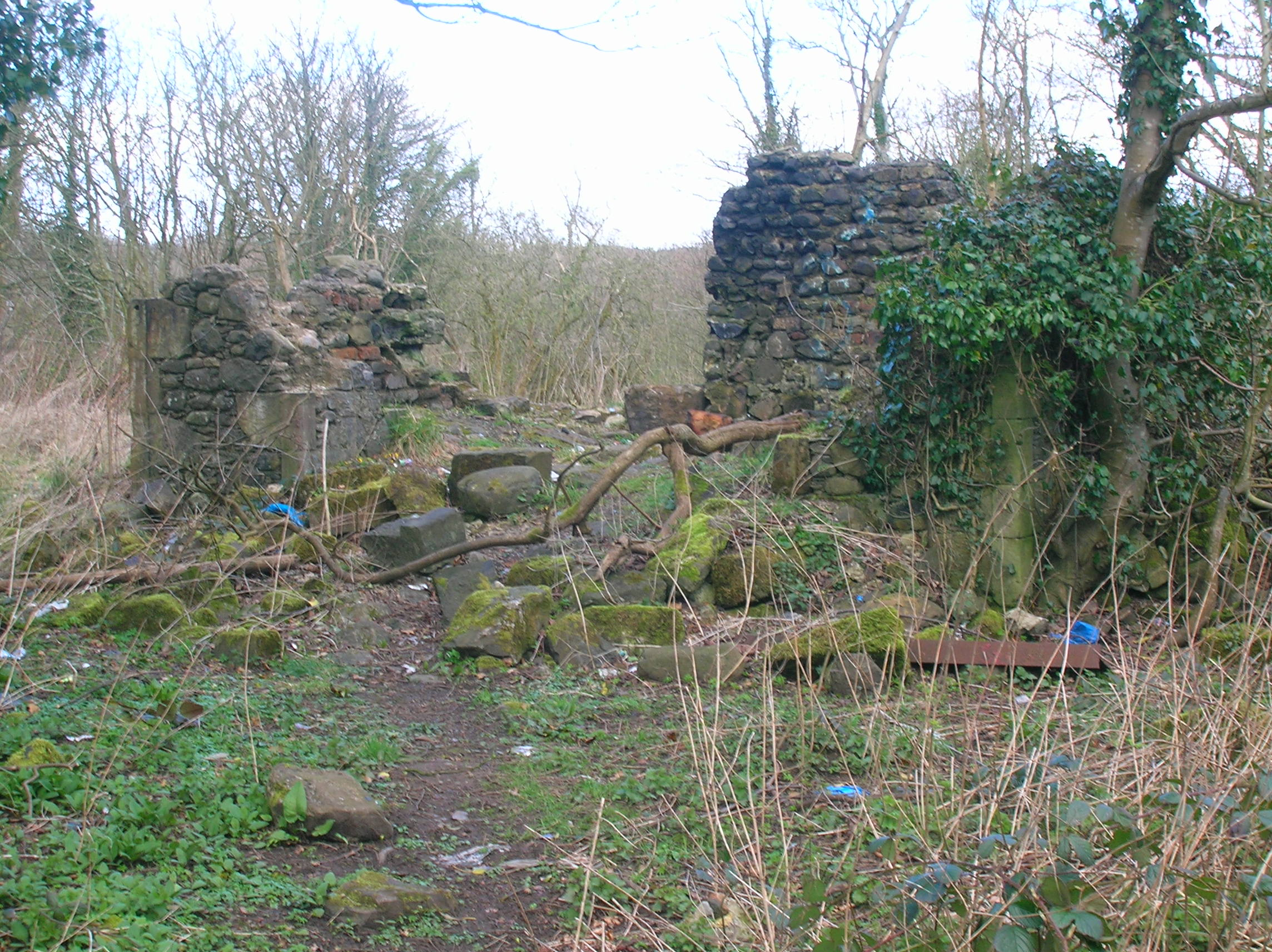
Ruins of estate outbuildings

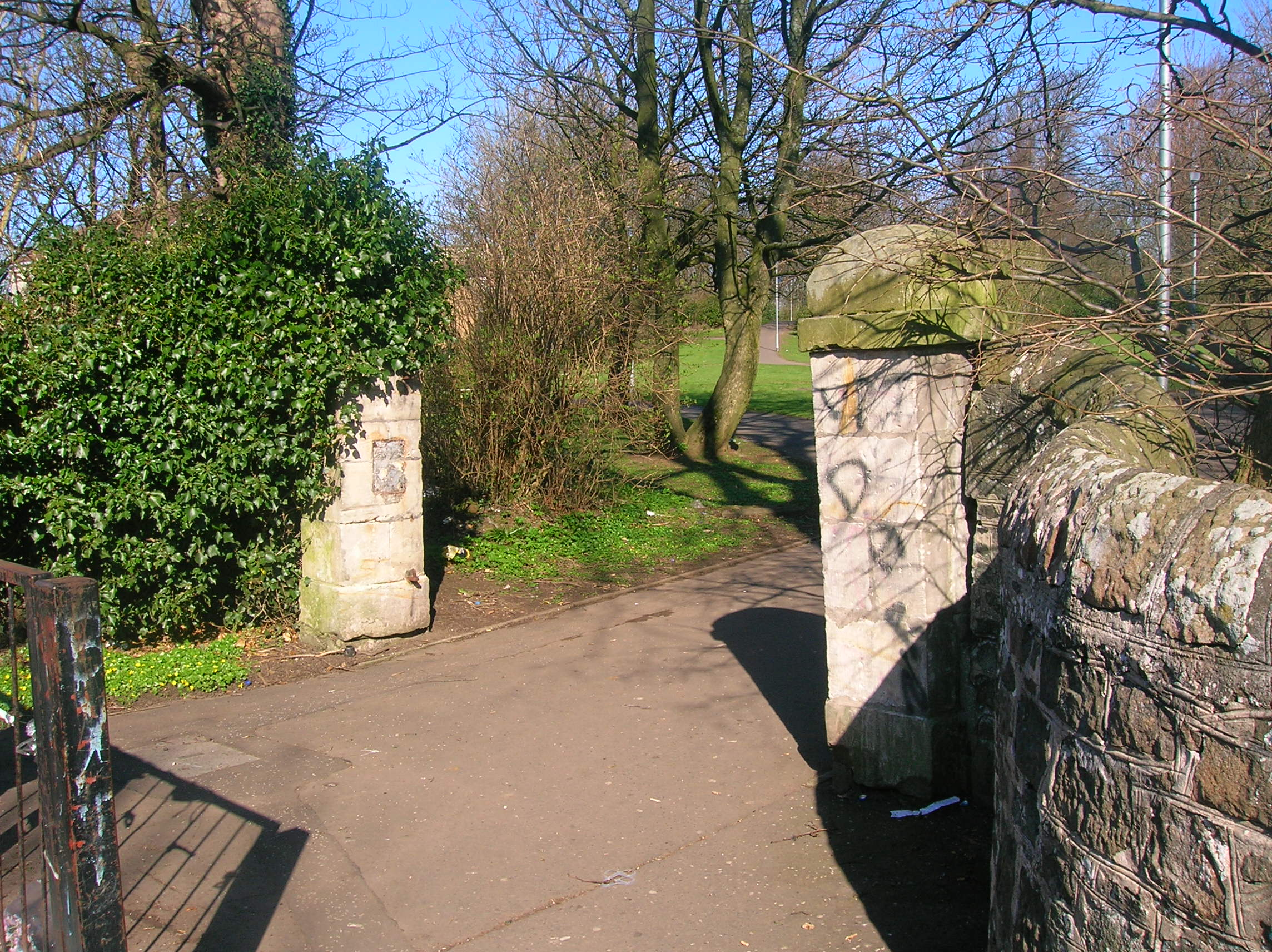
An old entrance gate to Bourtreehill House

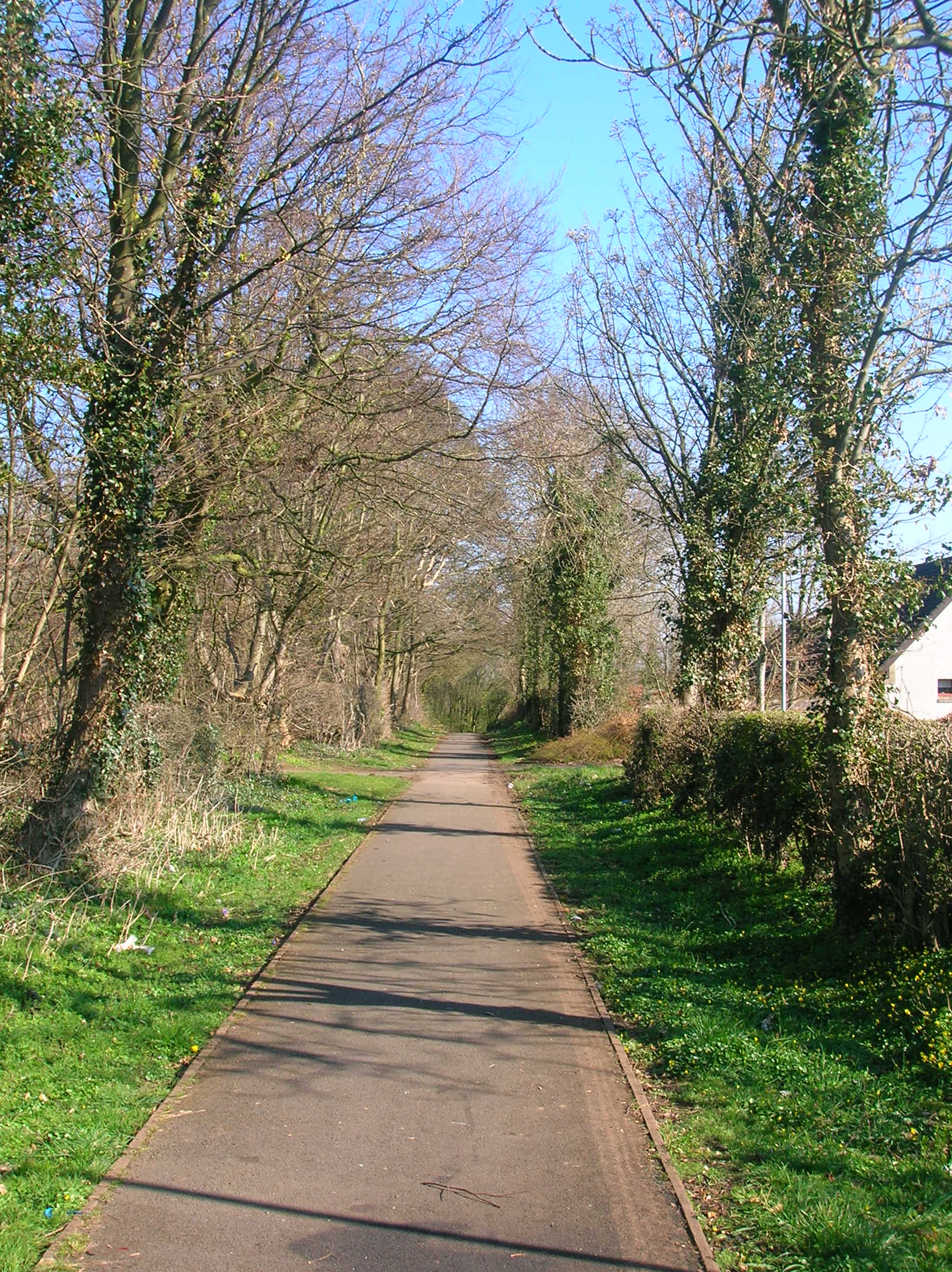
The old farm lane running down to the Annick Water

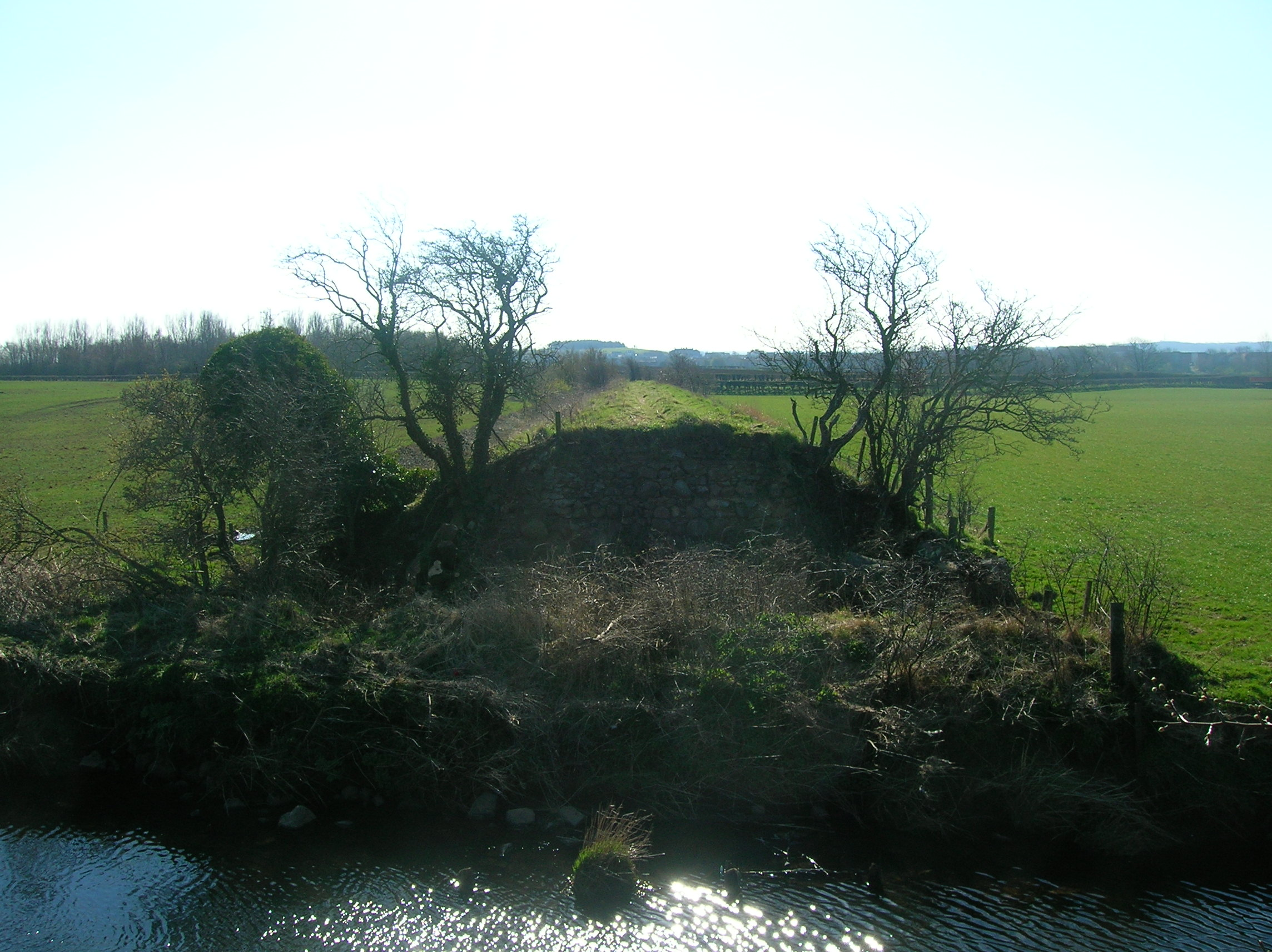
The course of the old railway line to Perceton Colliery

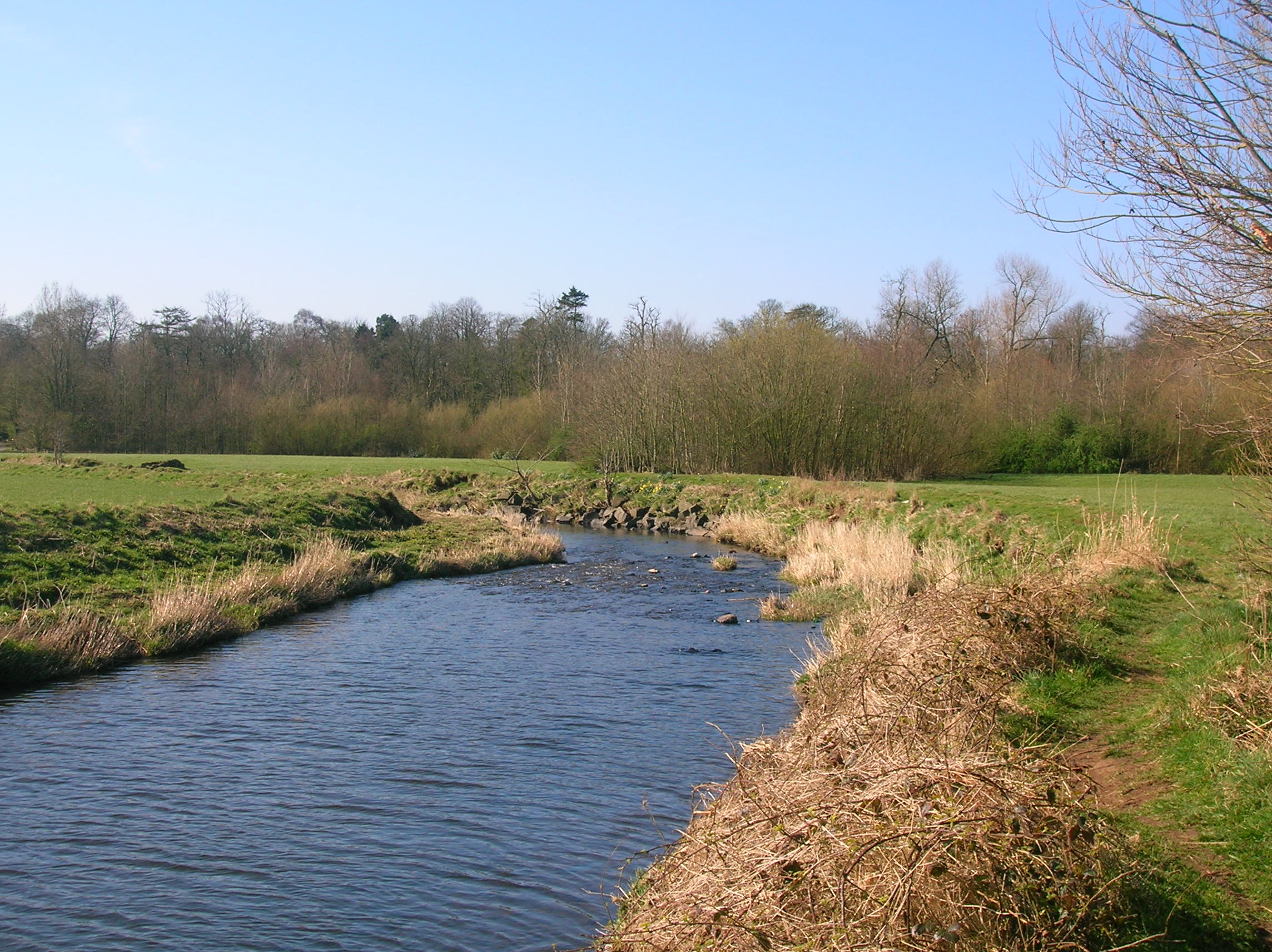
The Annick Water

== Micro-history ==
The future estate of Rozelle in Ayr was purchased by Robert Hamilton of Bourtreehill, a former Jamaica merchant who named it after a Jamaican property and also built the mansion house (1760).

== See also ==
- Towerlands, North Ayrshire
- Cunninghamhead, Perceton and Annick Lodge
- Clan Montgomery
- Eglinton Country Park
- Dalry, Ayrshire
- Lynn Glen
