= Broomlands =

Village in North Ayrshire, Scotland

Coordinates: 55.614°N 4.634°W

Broomlands is district of Irvine in North Ayrshire, Scotland. Situated on a series of bends in the River Annick, Broomlands and its original features are now almost lost within the south-Bourtreehill and Broomlands housing scheme.

== History ==
The remaining features take the form of road and path networks which are still in use after several hundred years. More recent networks and routes were created in the 17th and 18th century when the railways first arrived in Broomlands. Long before the age of steam, people were not unused to seeing railway networks carrying minerals and wood and being pushed by strong but buckled men. In Broomlands, the remains of a late 17th-century railway path can still be discerned.

The prehistoric history of Broomlands is more plentiful. At the end of the last ice-age, Broomlands was on the coast. When the sea receded from the area, it left behind a huge coal field which would be exploited by the people of Broomlands and Bourtreehill almost ten thousand years later.

Those later exploiters opened various coal-pits, open-cast mines and collieries in the district. Railways were networked to carry the coal away from the fields.

A standard gauge railway ran through Broomlands until the late 1960s, originally built by the Glasgow and South Western Railway Company, linking the towns of Irvine and Kilmarnock. Although the nearby station was titled as Dreghorn station, it was closer to Broomlands. The track bed has been paved over and now is in use as a footpath. Mineral railways from various local coal mines branched on to this line.

Broomlands was eventually sold to the owner of Bourtreehill house.

From August 2014 residents of Broomlands and Bourtreehill will be educated in the newly built Elderbank Primary School.
