= Bourtreehill =

Housing estate in North Ayrshire, Scotland

Coordinates: 55°37′0.3″N 4°37′45.3″W

Modern housing estate of Bourtreehill

Bourtreehill is a large housing estate built by the Irvine Development Corporation (IDC) in the late 1970s which forms part of the Irvine New Town in North Ayrshire, Scotland. The estate has two main parts, known as Bourtreehill North and Bourtreehill South. Along its southern border runs the Broomlands estate. The Bourtreehill South area has suffered from anti-social behaviour. However, with more frequent police and Community Warden Patrols, this has gone down, though the area still suffers from the lack of employment opportunities in North Ayrshire.

== Etymology ==
"Bour Tree" is an alternative name for the common elder tree, Sambucus nigra, often found in the older and more biodiverse local woodlands.

== Geography ==
Bourtreehill is north of the village of Dreghorn. The Annick Water, a tributary of the River Irvine, runs through Bourtreehill.

== History ==
Bourtreehill (and Broomlands) housing estates were built in the late 1970s to meet the demands of a burgeoning population. They developed around the older Bourtreehill House estate. Rather than being controlled by local or regional government, they were managed by Irvine Development Corporation, a body set up for the purpose of regenerating Irvine.

Originally, Bourtreehill housing scheme was intended to be substantially larger than it is today, extending beyond the River Annick, further towards Perceton. However, with a considerable number of old mine workings, some of which have not been charted, this was abandoned.

North Bourtreehill has been a troubled community since its inception with several different construction companies being involved, some of which went bankrupt partway through the project. This has resulted in a wide variety of housing styles of varying quality. Since the disbanding of IDC, the houses which had not been sold to private ownership fell under either local council administration (Cunninghame District Council, now North Ayrshire council) or, in some cases, were owned by a housing association.

=== Missing toddler ===
On 23 April 1976, the case of Sandy Davidson hit the headlines in Scotland as he has been one of the many children to go missing in Scotland. He has not been seen since despite the case being featured on the television programme Lorraine Kelly Investigates: Missing Children.

=== Unsolved murder ===
In an incident that shocked the community of Bourtreehill a young mother was brutally murdered. In broad daylight on 10 November 1994 Shona Stevens had her life taken away from her violently while walking on the footpath in Bourtreehill Park / Middleton Park on the way back to her nearby house. This murder remains unsolved.

== Social problems ==
The community of Bourtreehill has a range of social problems such as drug dealing, underage drinking and petty acts of vandalism. This has been blamed on the lack of facilities for young people in the area, although several projects have sought to address this. These are however problems common in many areas of nearly every town up and down Britain. With new regeneration schemes and building works planned for the future, the social problems of old should lessen if not cease.

== Amenities ==
Bourtreehill is home to a library which was originally sited in the Towerlands Gate area. This original library was quite small, and also both users and library staff had concerns about the possibility of their cars being vandalised. In 1996, the library moved to a site directly next to the British Telecom exchange building in Cheviot Way. This custom built building cost 280,000 pounds sterling to build, and has since been vandalised on numerous occasions.

There are no public houses in Bourtreehill since both the But 'n' Ben and The Village Inn closed. There is, however, a Sports club located to the north of the village centre.

The demolition of the Towerlands Gate Complex resulted in a limited number shops available within the estate the village centre has a small shopping complex which provides a basic service for the community. It includes stores ranging from a Small Supermarket, a newsagent with an internal sub post office, bookmaker, Chinese Take-Away, a chemists, and a hairdresser. Although a small News Agent/Grocery Store has opened up in the Towerlands Gate area on the site of the former But'n'Ben.

There is also a community centre in the old Towerlands Farm. The farm had lain derelict for a number of years until it was refurbished. A group was set up called Bourtreehill and Broomlands Community Association (BABCA), and the community centre is used for various activities. BABCA at one point used to issue an irregular local newsletter making residents of the Bourtreehill and Broomlands area aware of coming events in the community centre and local issues which might affect them. This practice seems to have stopped some years ago.

The local Health Centre is located in Cheviot Way. There has been a Health Centre in Cheviot Way for many years. Originally it was a small prefabricated building which was situated just a short distance down the road across from the Telecom building where there is now a sheltered housing complex. Now it is in a newer, larger building with other facilities, including a dentist.

The Irvine New Town Trail is a cycle and pedestrian route which passes through Bourtreehill, giving relatively 'car free' access to Girdle Toll, Eglinton Country Park, Broomlands, Springside, Kilmarnock and beyond.

== Transport ==
The area is served by Stagecoach West Scotland

- 25 - Broomlands / Bourtreehill - Beith (Mon - Sat Evenings)
- 28 - Broomlands / Bourtreehill - Irvine Railway Station / Tesco (Mon - Sat Mornings / Afternoons)
- 28A - Broomlands / Bourtreehill - Livingstone Terrace (Mon - Sat Evenings & Sundays)
- X34 - Glasgow - Bourtreehill (Mon - Fri)
- X79 - Glasgow - Castlepark (Mon - Fri)

== Education ==
Educational needs in Bourtreehill are at present met by 1 Non-denominational Primary School (Elderbank Primary School) and 1 Roman Catholic School (St John Ogilvie Primary School).

On 3 March 2011 the Scottish government granted North Ayrshire Council consent to close Broomlands, Fencedyke and Towerlands Primary Schools, a new school would be built on the existing Broomlands site which would serve both Bourtreehill and Broomlands Estates. This site was chosen due to its central location within the revised catchment area. The new school opened to open to pupils in August 2014. The new school is called Elderbank Primary School.

Although the Primary School catchment areas will change there will be no change to the Senior Schools Catchment area. And so children of a senior school age will fall into the catchment area of Greenwood Academy.

== See also ==
- Towerlands, North Ayrshire
- Scotland of the Vandals (photo essay showing Bourtreehill)
