= Annick Water =

Tributary of the River Irvine in Scotland

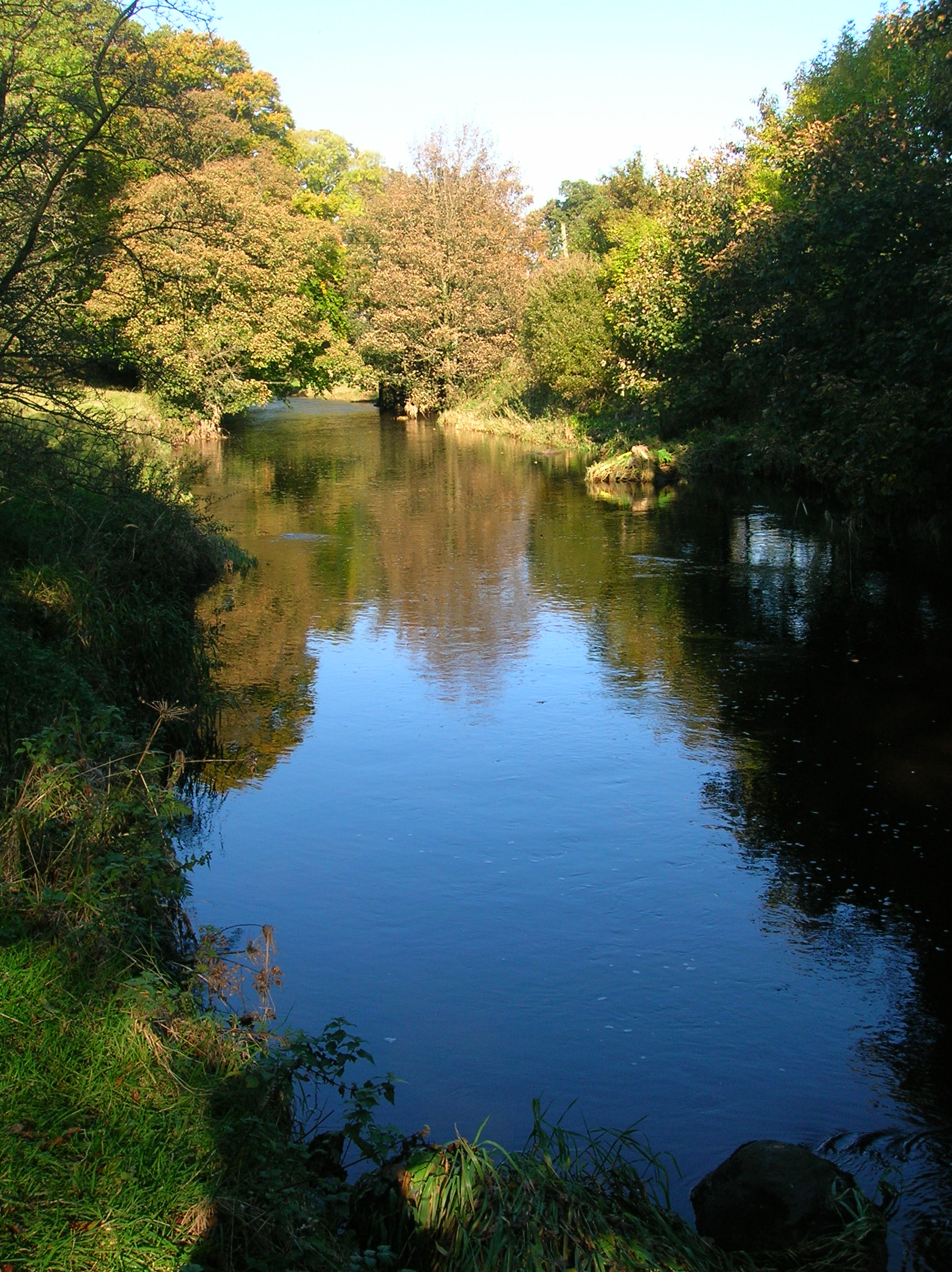
- The Annick Water near Cunninghamhead mill

Location
- Country: Scotland

Physical characteristics
- Source
  - location: Long Loch (East Renfrewshire)
- Mouth: River Irvine
  - location: Irvine, North Ayrshire, Scotland
  - coordinates: 55.60393°N 4.66110°W

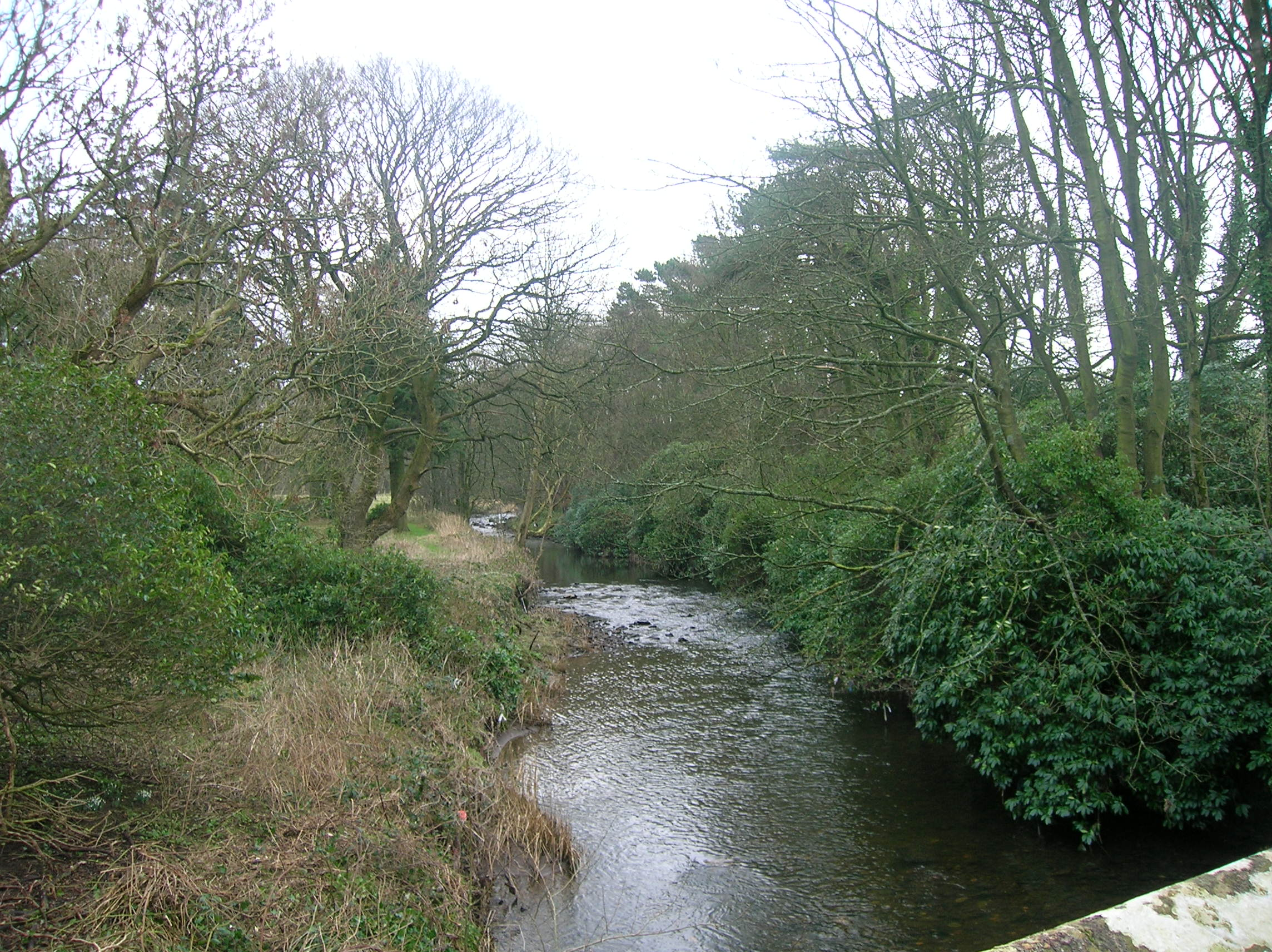
The Annick Water looking upstream from Chapeltoun Bridge.

The Annick Water (previously also spelled as Annack, Annoch (1791) or Annock) is the largest tributary of the River Irvine. The river runs from Long Loch, just inside East Renfrewshire, in a generally south-western direction through North Ayrshire and East Ayrshire, to confluence with its parent river at Irvine, North Ayrshire on the west coast of Scotland. The name may derive from the Gaelic for 'overflowing' and Strathannick is very much prone to flooding as recorded by SEPA.

The water now (2006) appears to be pollution free for most of its length. An independent survey in the Bourtreehill (1999) area revealed a strong colony of freshwater shrimp, a crustacean known only to live in relatively clean water.

On 27 January 2009 a BP tanker train carrying liquid fuels (diesel and heating oil) from Mossend to Riccarton was derailed near the bridge over the Stewarton to Kilmaurs road at Peacockbank Farm. Several wagons subsequently caught fire. The Annick Water was polluted, however, it escaped major contamination.

== History ==
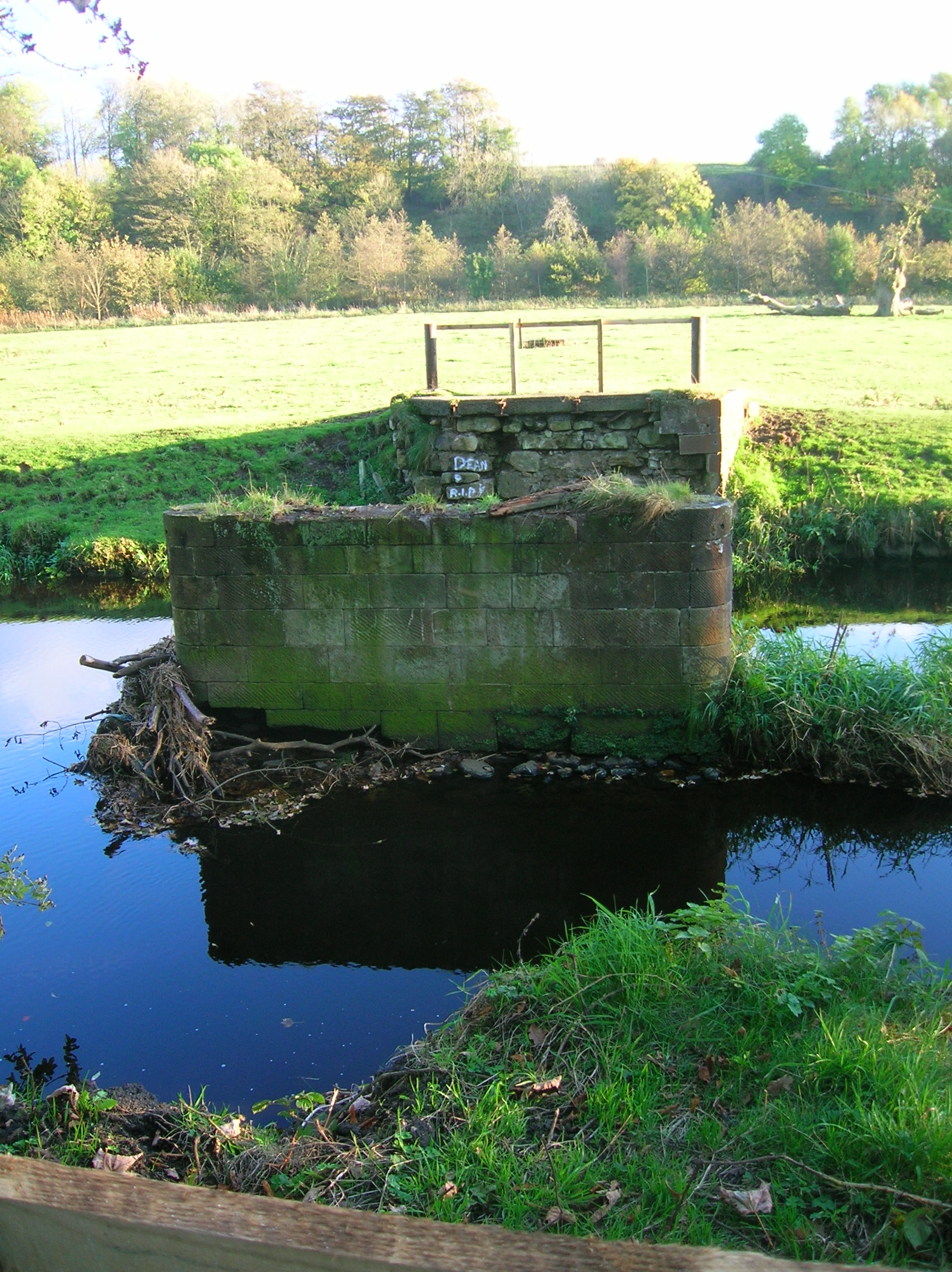
The dismantled bridge at Lainshaw after the drowning in 2007.

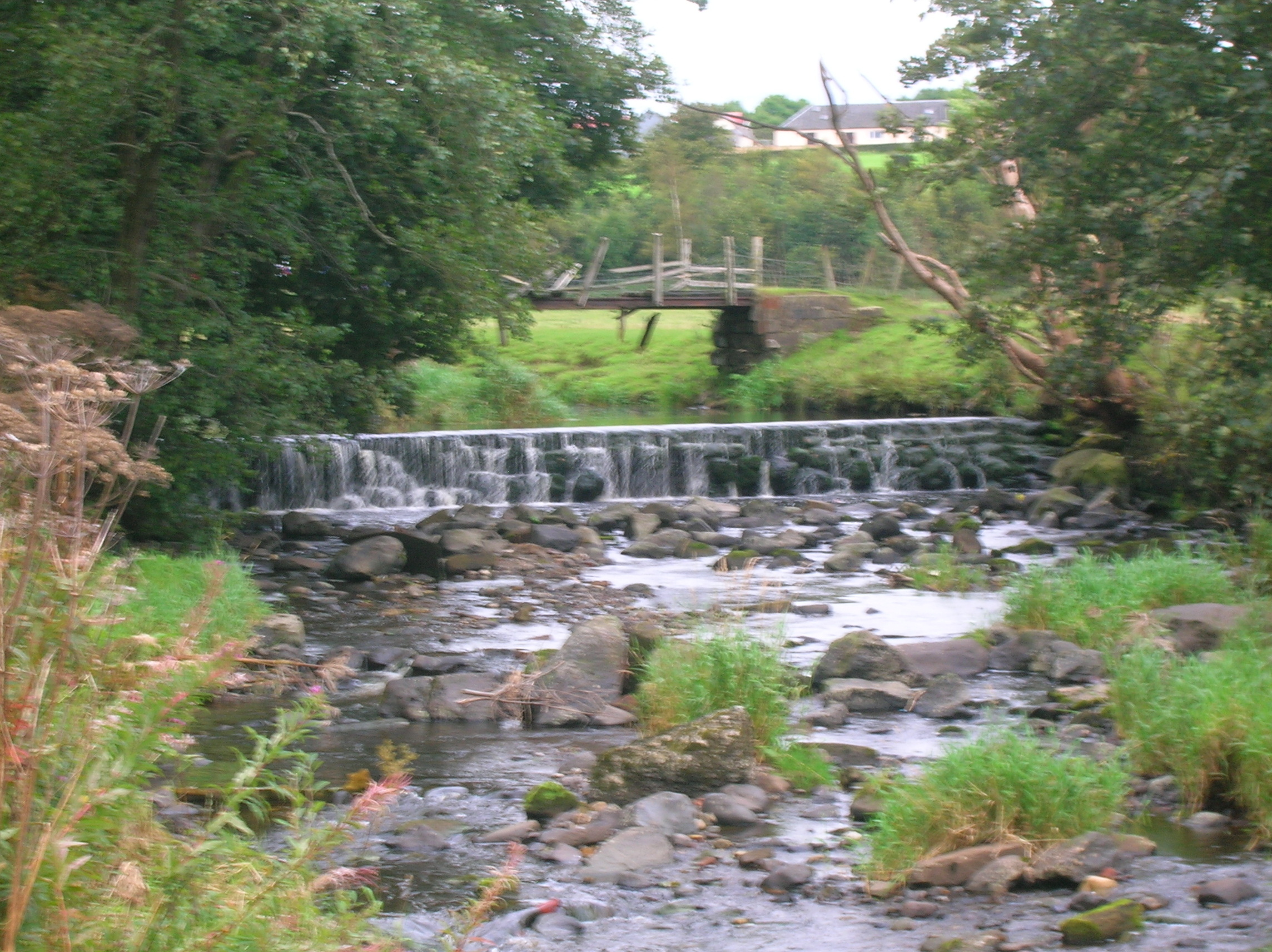
The bridge and weir below Lainshaw House.

Mesolithic man used the Annick as his waterway. From Bourtreehill to Dreghorn, the Annick has presented us with many artifacts dating from that time. Indeed, recent archaeological evidence from Dreghorn uncovered the oldest continually used settlement in Europe. This mesolithic village was on the banks of the Annick.

A number of mills existed along its length with only Cunninghamhead Mill still standing today (2006). Lambroch Mill was located near Laigh Castleton Farm. Scroaggy or Fairliecrevoch Mill was a waulk or cloth mill and existed until the 1960s, with its lade cutting across the large loop in the river near Ramstane. Downstream from Cunninghamhead was a sawmill and a corn mill existed in Perceton near the old church. Scroag or scrog is a crab apple or gnarled treestumps in old Scots and this 'nickname' well describes the area where the mill stood.

A number of fords and stepping stones are present, notably at Chapeltoun, Lambroch Mill, and at Ramstane where a footbridge was also present. A footbridge is still present at Laigh Castleton and a weir existed close to Lainshaw House, raising the water level to form an area which was ideal for water fowl. A small weir is still present beneath the surviving bridge into the Lainshaw Holm. Wooden carriageway bridges existed at two places on the Lainshaw estate; the stone built abutments are still visible.

A number of old bridges cross the Annick Water along its entire length, such as at Stewarton and Chapeltoun. Notable is the 17th century remains of bridge-supports in Bourtreehill's own stretch of the Annick. Other early railway bridges cross its shallow and easy waters. The lower reaches were known as Strathannick in the 18th century, but the name has sadly gone out of use.

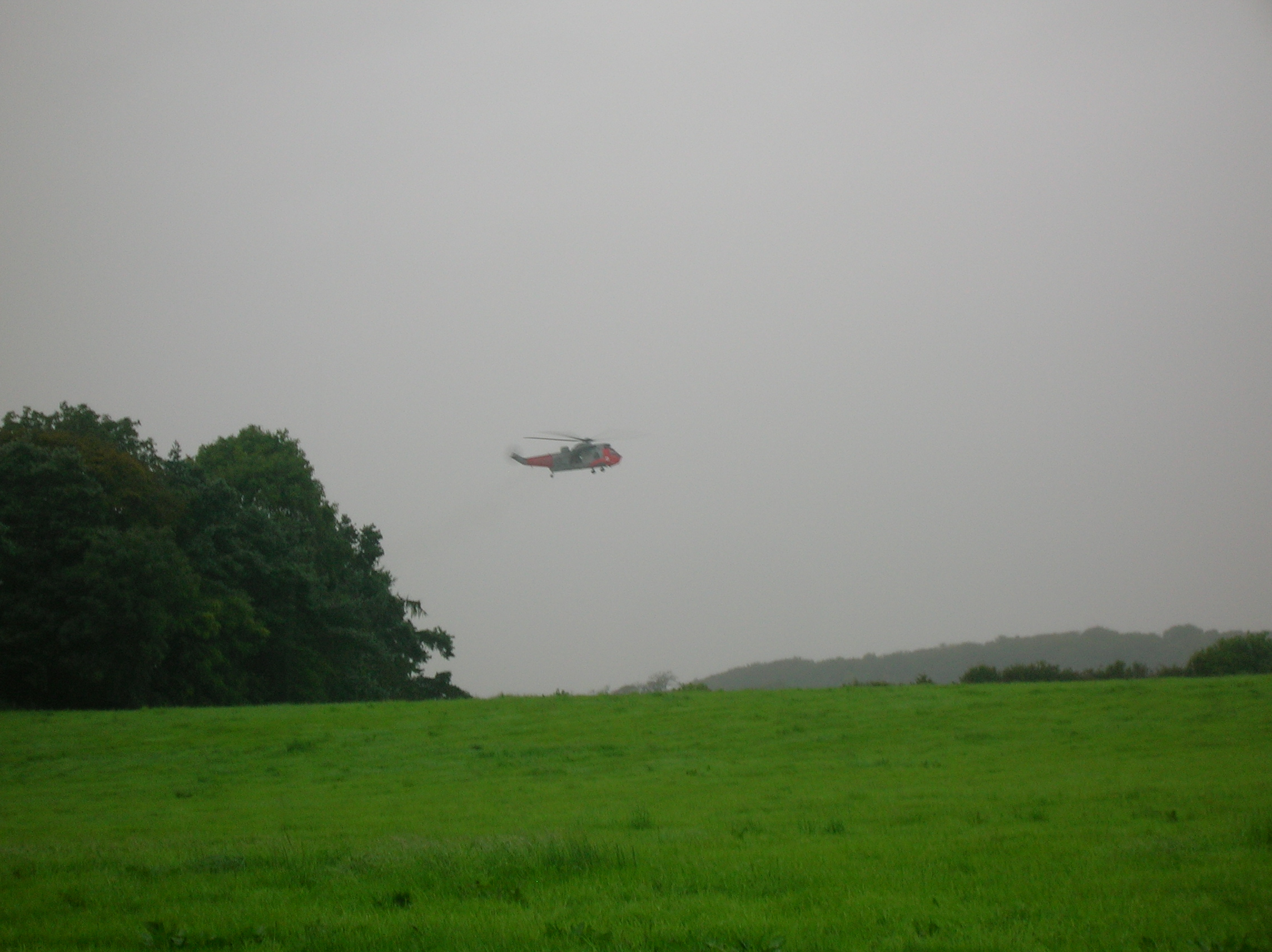
Helicopter searching the Annick Water at Lambroughton in 2007.

=== Death on the Annick ===
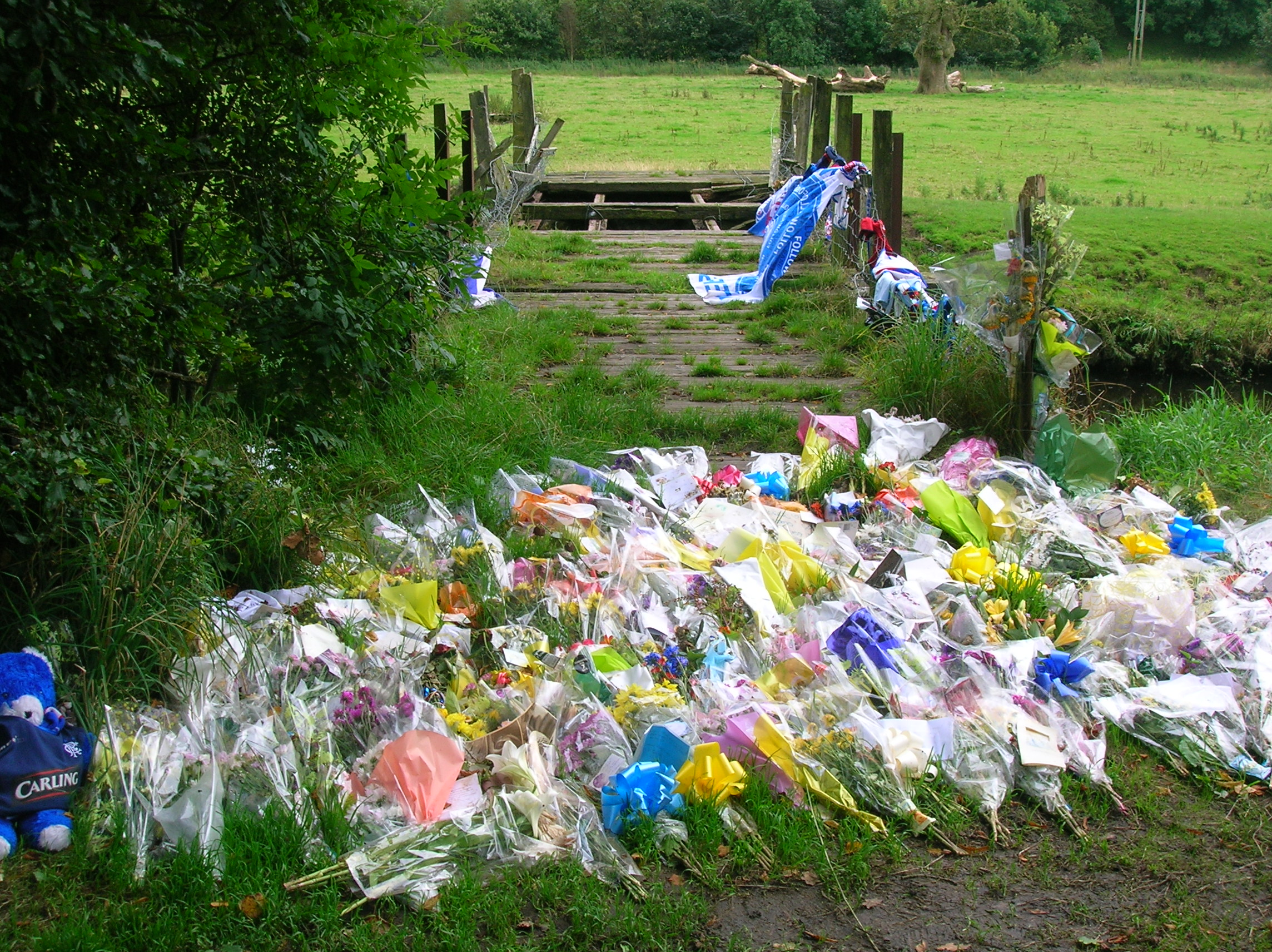
Memorial flowers, etc. at the Annick Water below Lainshaw House.

During a particularly long feud between the Cunningham and Montgomery families in the 16th and 17th centuries, the fourth Earl of Eglinton was murdered at a ford on the Annick at Bridgend in Stewarton.

The river can be dangerous and a gravestone in Dreghorn Parish Church records the death by drowning of a young lad from Perceton in Victorian times.

On 18 August 2007 a Stewarton boy, Dean McGregor, fell into the Annick Water when it was in flood. The scene of the tragedy was near Lainshaw House. An RAF 'Search and Rescue' helicopter from HMS Gannet searched the river for several hours, unsuccessfully. The body was found in the river a few days later near the sewerage works.

== Wildlife ==
North American mink have been sighted along the banks of the Annick. This aggressive animal was unfortunately introduced to Britain and has been the cause for much concern for many years.

Kingfishers have been spotted flying above the surface of the water, successfully catching small fish in their beaks.

The eel, which originates in the Sargasso Sea has been known to cross land at certain sections of the Annick River. This is a common habit of the eel but the sight is rather odd.

As well as some Trout and Salmon it has a healthy population of Sticklebacks, Minnows, Freshwater Shrimps, Freshwater Limpets, Caddisfly Larvae, Blackfly, Stonefly and Leeches, indicating that the water quality is good. Mallard and heron are frequently encountered and the occasional Great Crested Grebe can be seen. Eels are sometimes to be found on land, especially in wet weather, taking a shortcut across the top of the lengthy loops that are found in the river in the area.

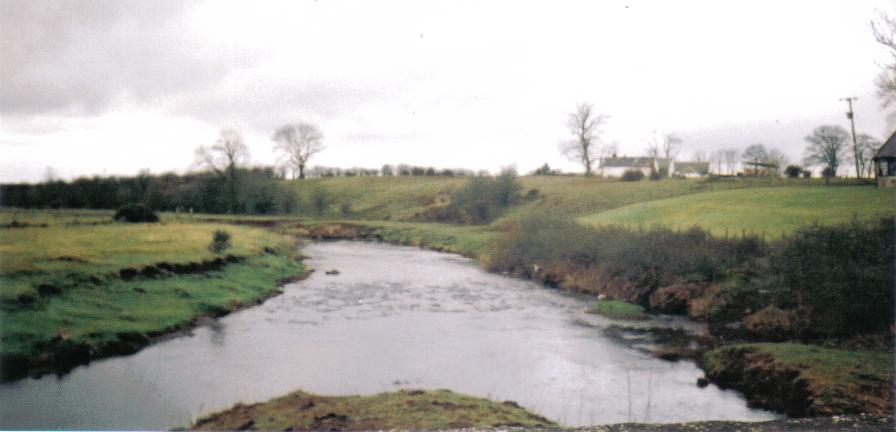
The Glazert rivulet and the Annick Water at Water Meetings.

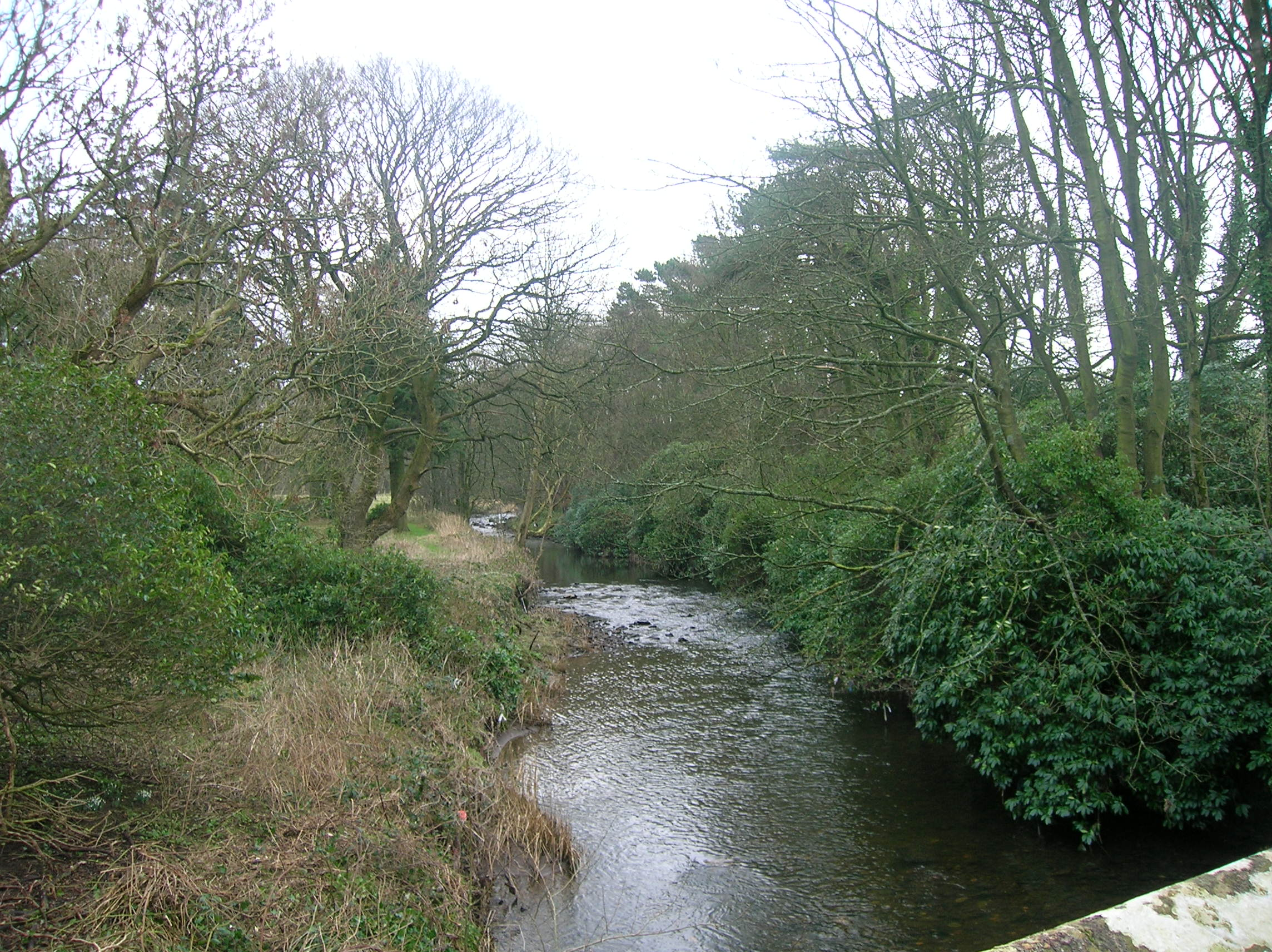
The Annick Water looking upstream from Chapeltoun Bridge.

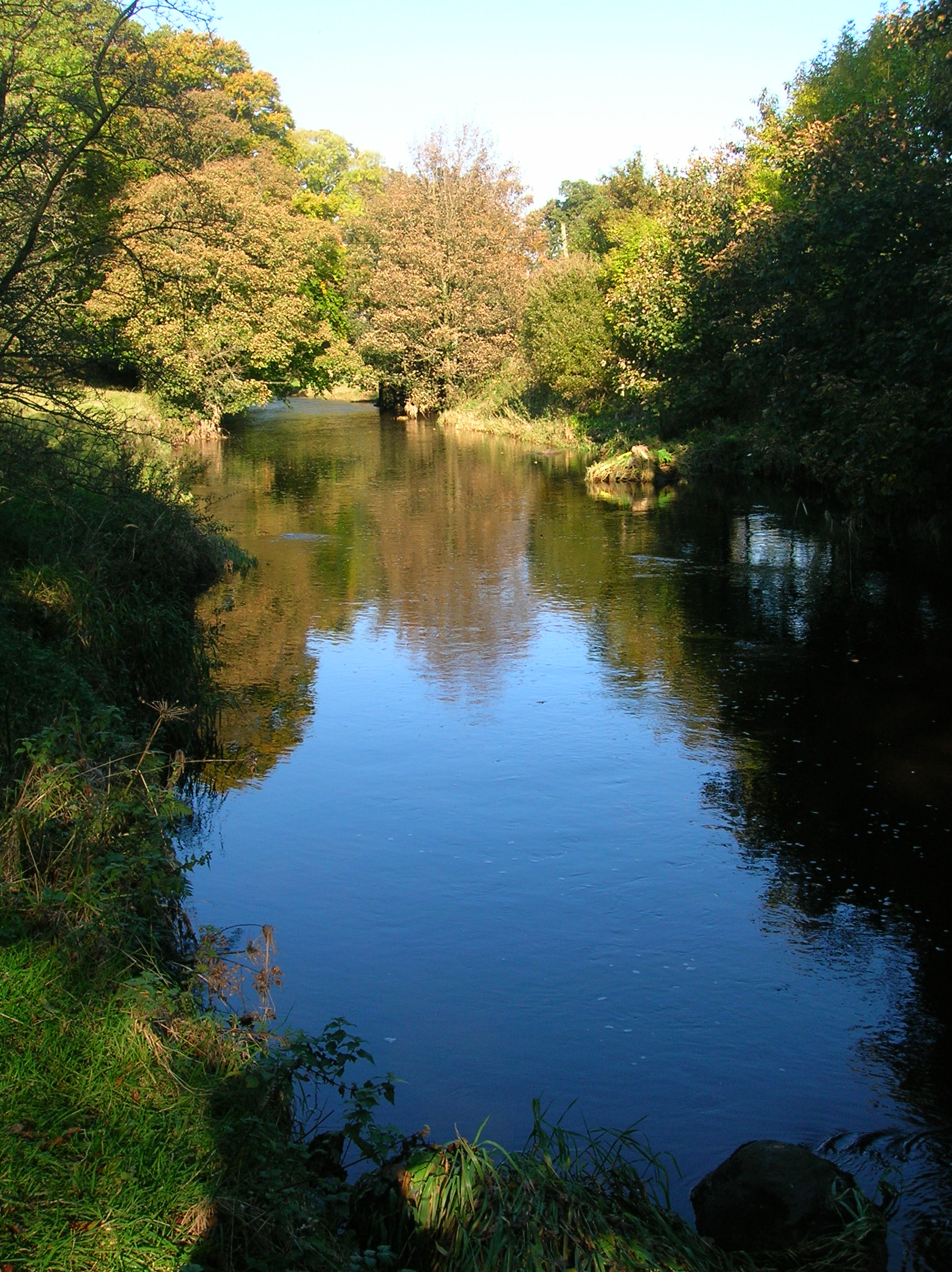
The Annick Water near Cunninghamhead mill.

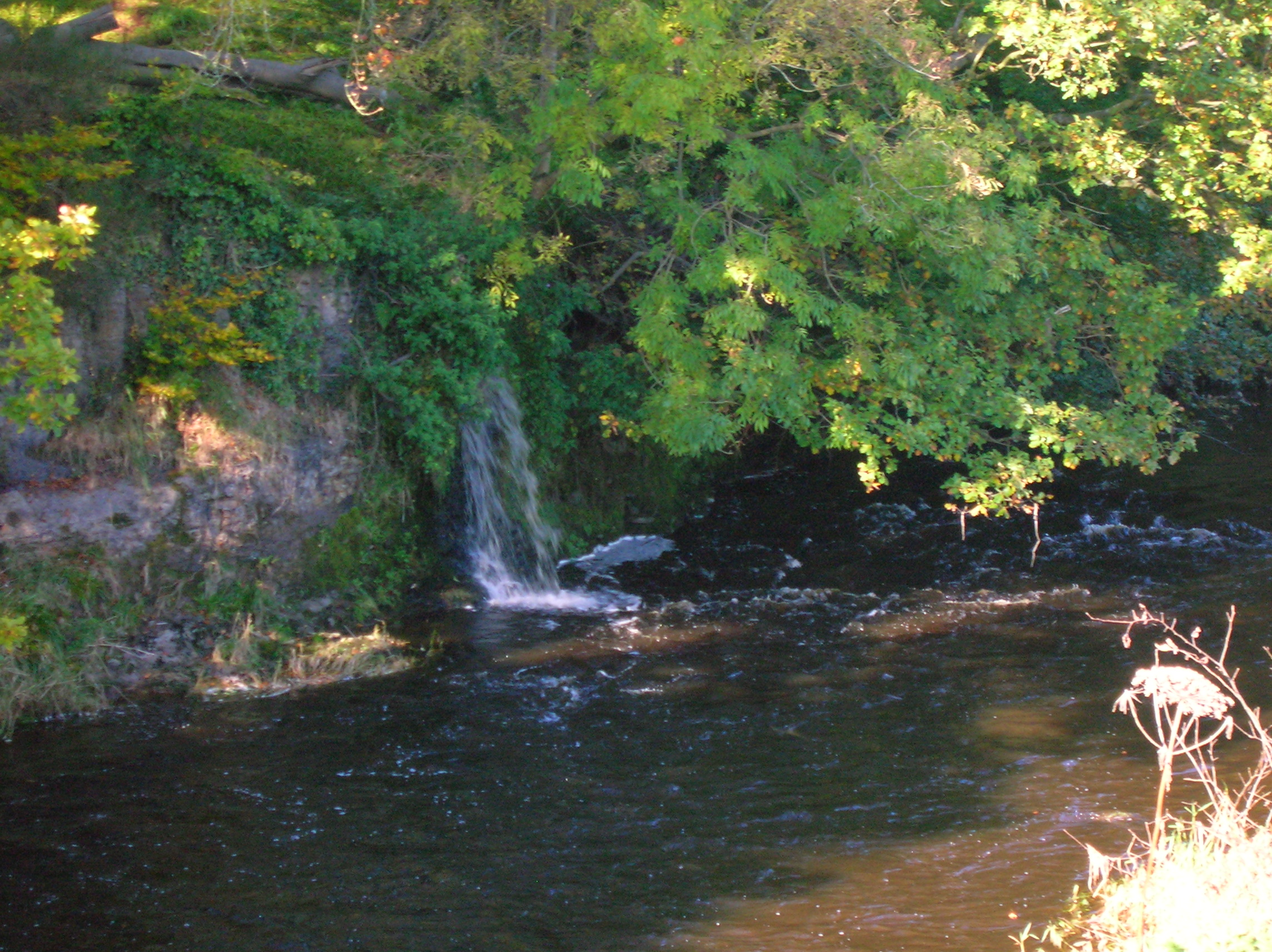
A waterfall near Cunninghamhead bridge.

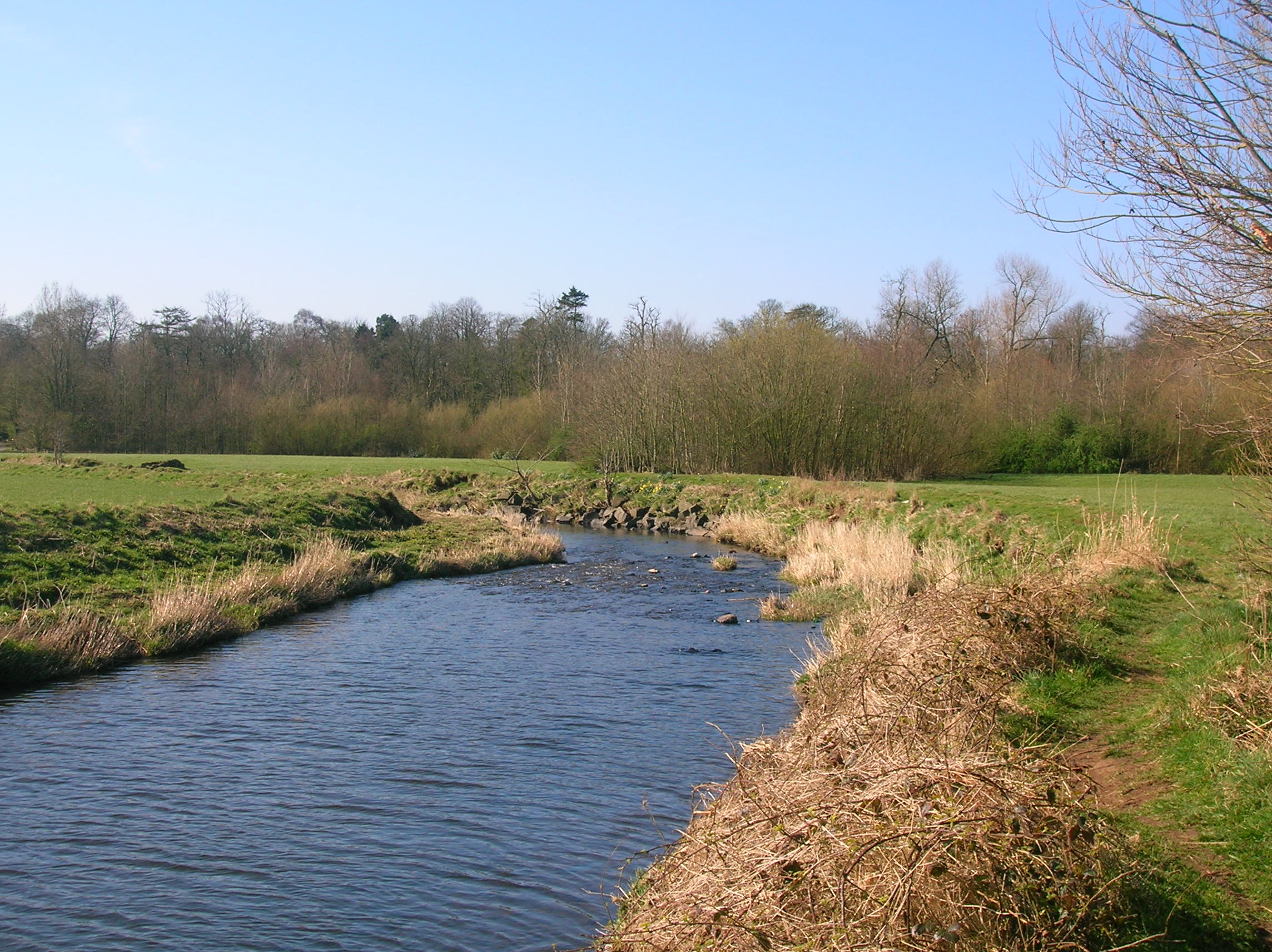
The Annick Water at Bourtreehill.

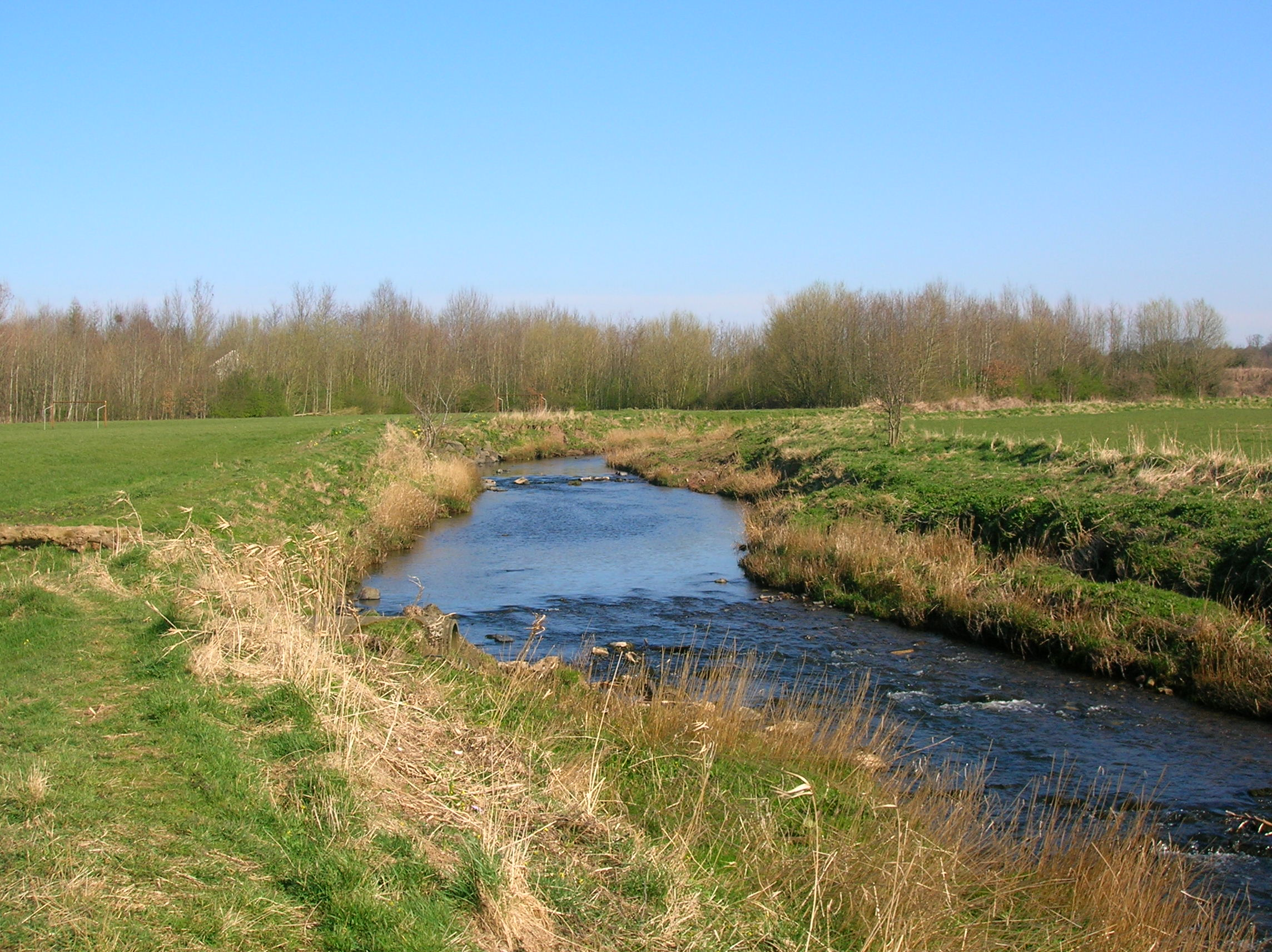
The Annick Water at Bourtreehill.

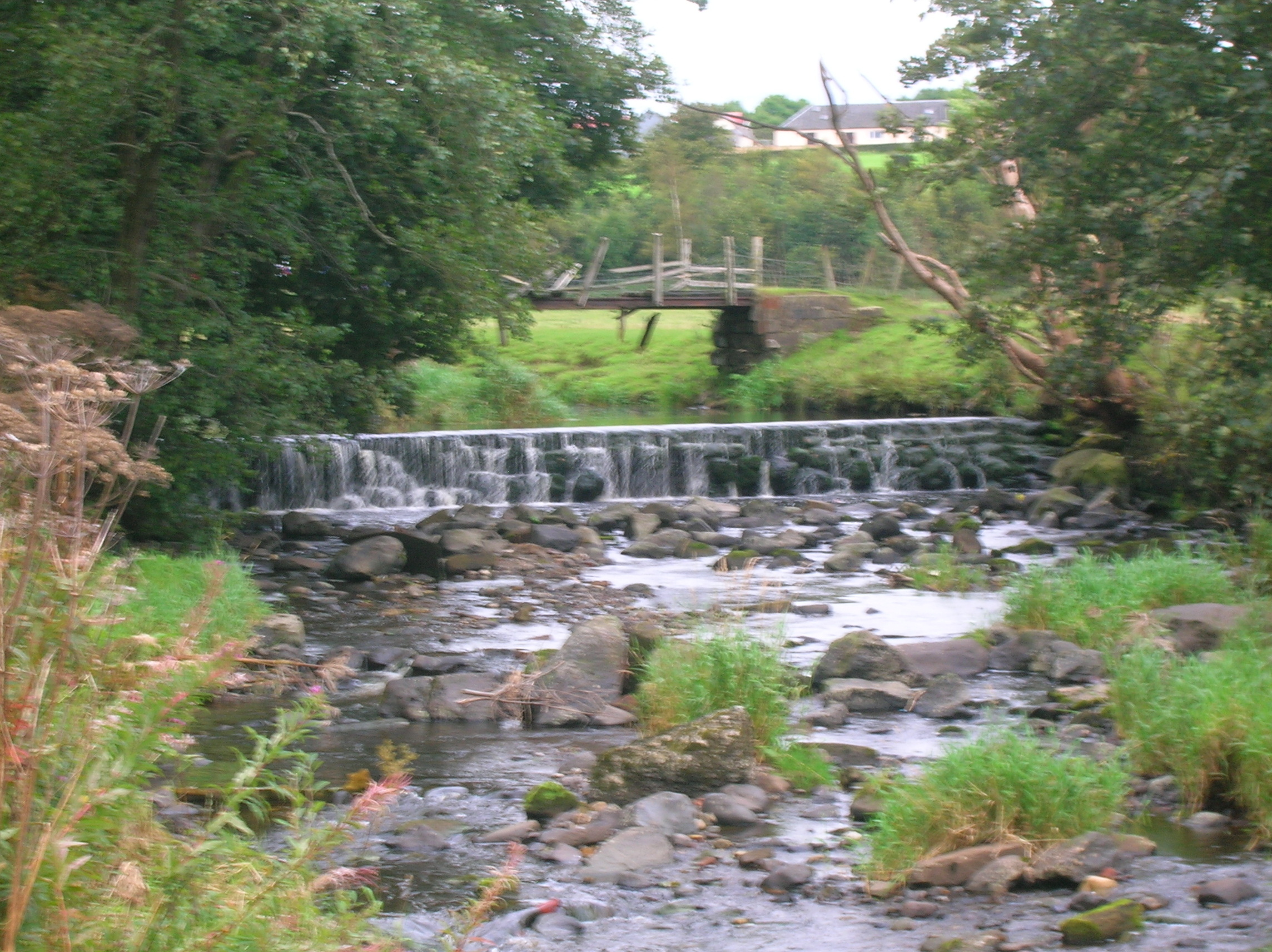
The bridge and weir below Lainshaw House.

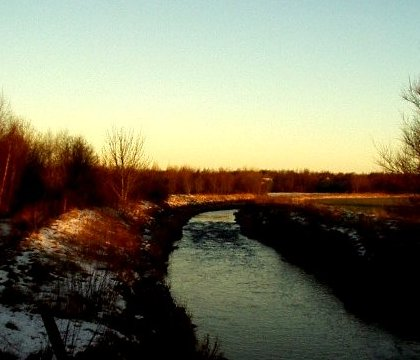
A View on the Annick Water.

Marchantia polymorpha, the Common Liverwort grows on the bare bedrock dykes of the Annick near Cunninghamhead Mill, this plant being much rarer than the name suggests. Pellia epiphyla and Lunularia liverworts grow on the earth riverside banks at Cunninghamhead and elsewhere. The riverside vegetation includes Butterburr, Reed-Canary Grass, Rushes, Water Forget-Me-Not, Brooklime-Speedwell, Giant Hogweed, Hemlock Water-Dropwort, Willows and Alders.

== See also ==
- Cunninghamhead
- Corsehill
- Chapeltoun
- Lambroughton
- River Irvine
- Fullarton
