= Drukken Steps =

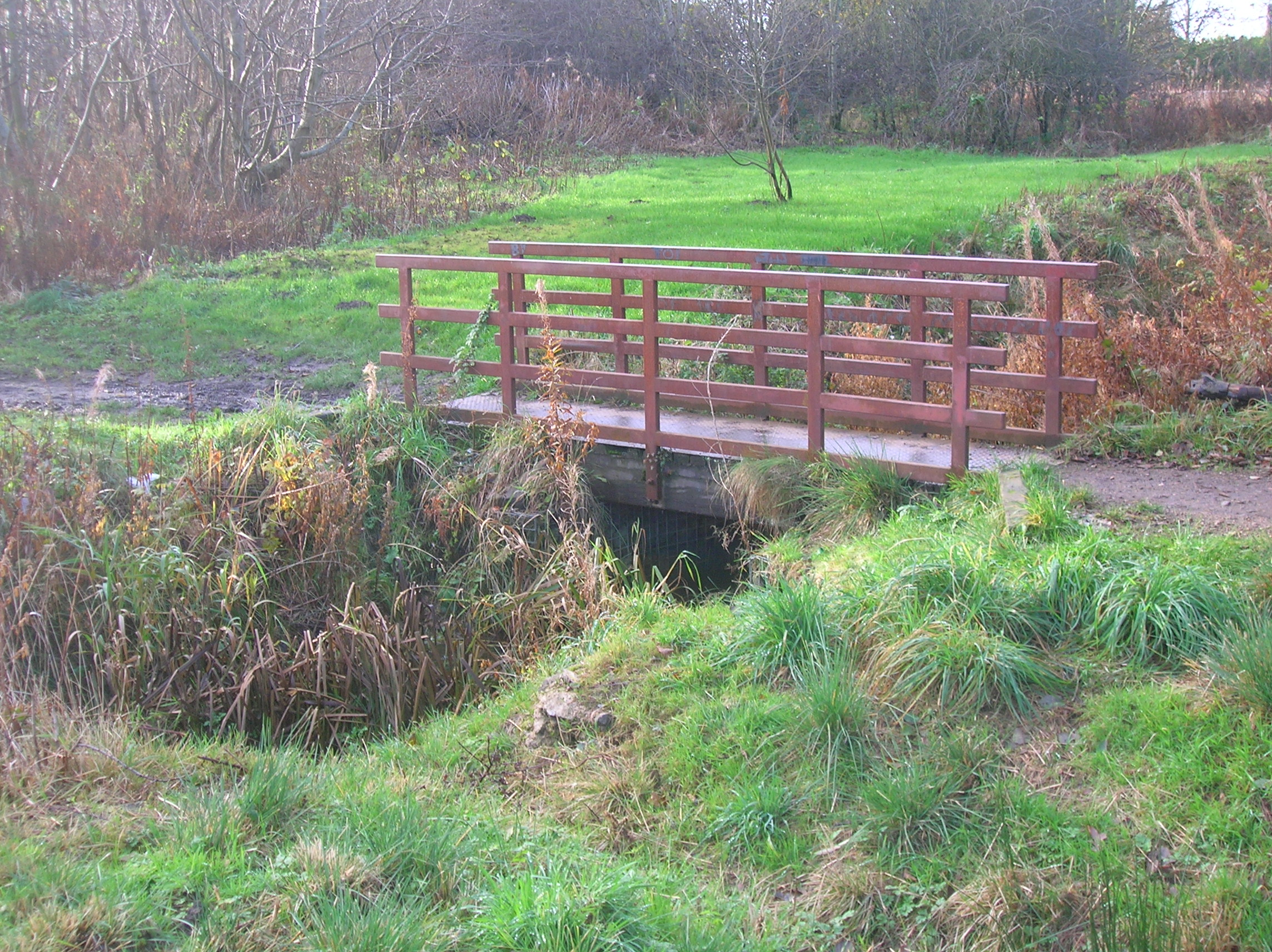
The site of the Drukken Steps over the Red Burn on the 1774 Toll road to Millburn via Higgens House

The Drukken, Drucken Steps or Drunken Steps were stepping stones across the Red Burn in Irvine, North Ayrshire, Scotland and are associated with Scotland's national poet, Robert Burns. Drukken is used on the commemorative cairn plaque, but Druken or Drucken may also be used.

== The site of the Drukken Steps ==
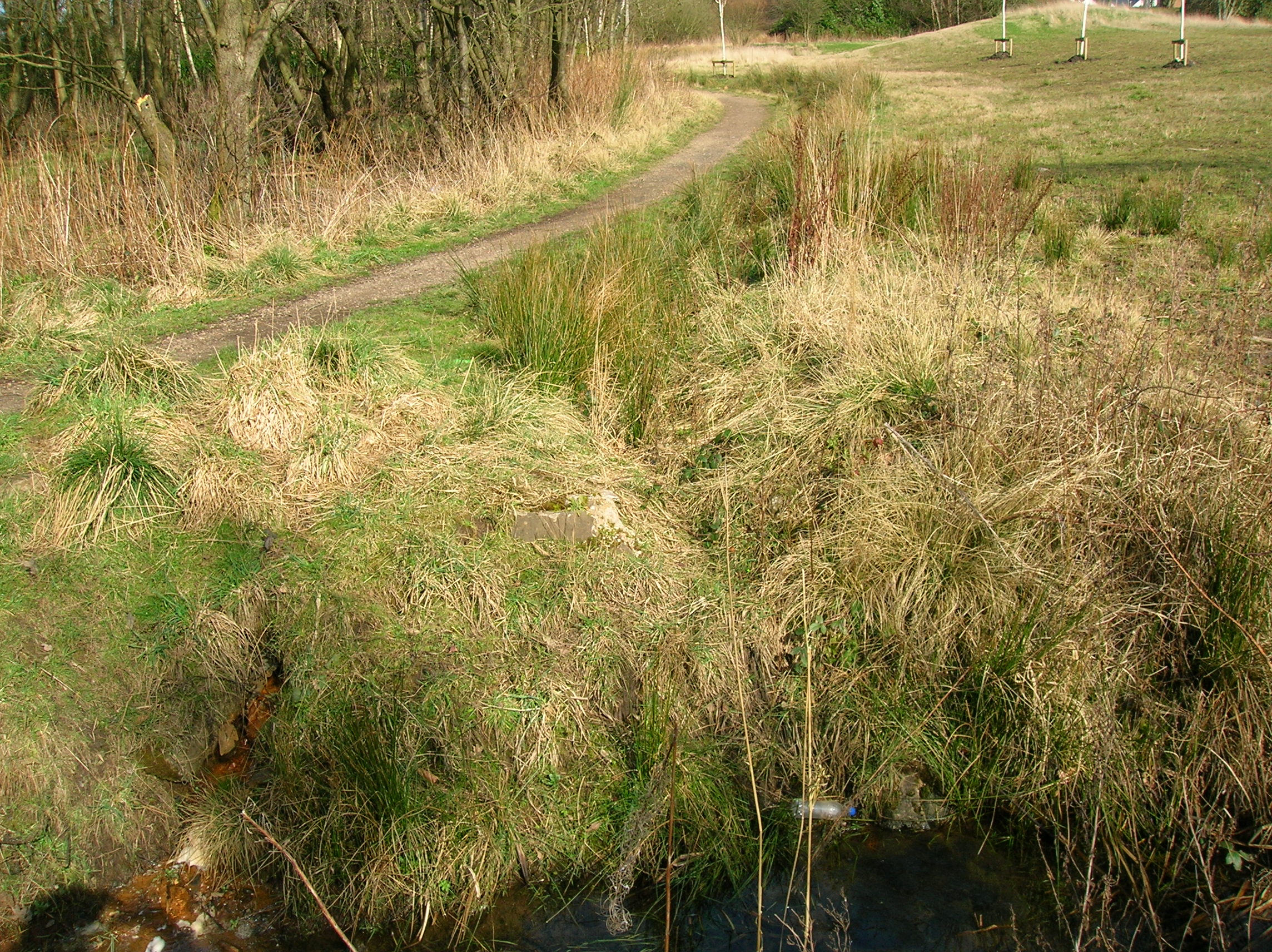
The 1960s bridge abutment at the site of the old Drukken Steps of circa 1966 with the old Toll Road route in the background

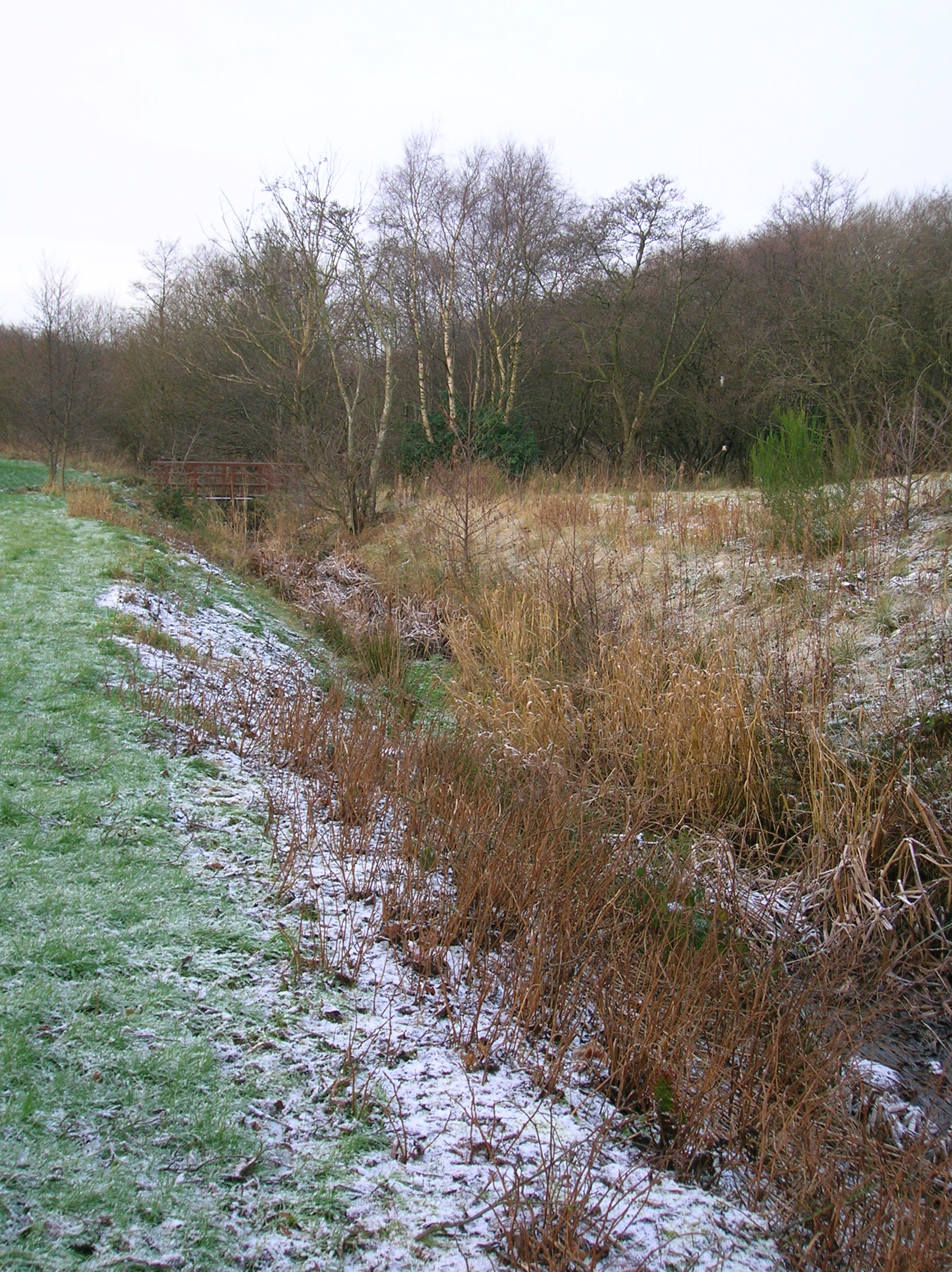
The site of the Drukken Steps.

The Drukken, or in English, the 'Drunken Steps' in the old Eglinton Woods near Stanecastle at NS 329 404, were a favourite haunt of Burns and his friend Richard Brown whilst the two were in Irvine in 1781 – 82. A commemorative cairn off Bank Street at MacKinnon Terrace in Irvine, next to the expressway, stands several hundred yards from the site of the Drukken stepping stones across the Red Burn, also said to be the site of Saint Bryde's, Brides or Bridget's well. Until 2009 it was generally thought that the Drukken Steps had been buried beneath the road surface of the Kilwinning bypass.

In 1799 the Earl closed the road beyond the Drucken Steps to 'protect' his new policies, providing a diversion which ran via Knadgerhill.

The stepping stones remained in situ without any bridge present until at least the late 1960s. The Red Burn was wider with a greater flow at that time, and the flow would have been even greater when Littlestane Loch, located near the old farm of that name, still existed.

The original plaque had been inserted in the old estate boundary wall at the site of the stepping stones, having been donated to the Irvine Burns Club by Sir Andrew R. Duncan of Irvine in 1927.

=== Origin of the name ===
The name 'Drukken' steps derives from a person's apparently drunken gait as they stepped from stone to stone whilst crossing the burn. Seven or more stones were originally set in the Red Burn which was much wider than now (2009). Burns himself used the Scots spelling 'Drucken' rather than 'Drukken' or 'Druken'. The Scots word 'drouk', meaning 'drench' is another possible derivation. Strawhorn refers to the site as the 'Drunken Steps' or 'Drucken Steps'.

== The commemorative cairn ==
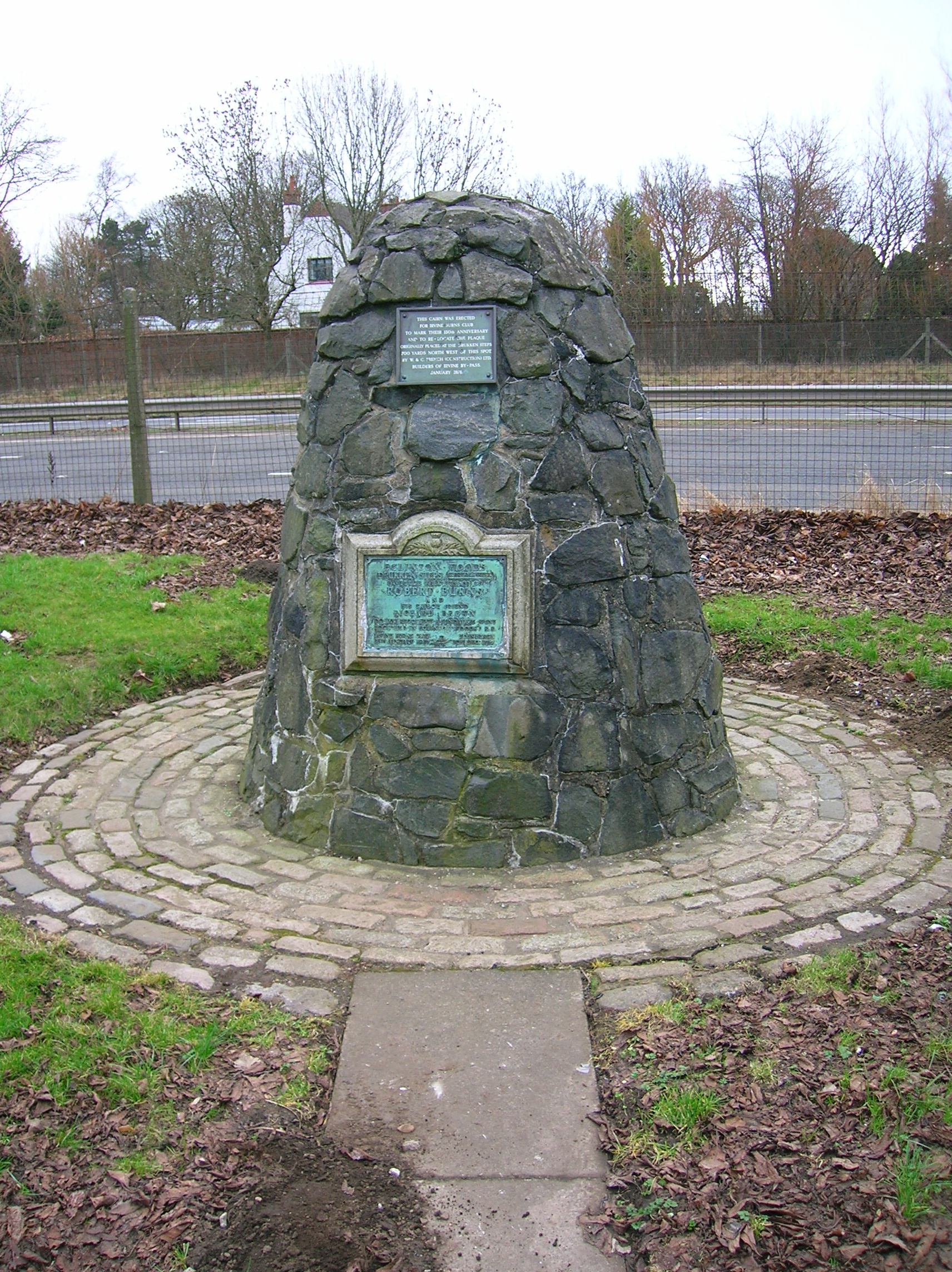
The Drukken Steps / Saint Bryde's Well commemorative cairn as relocated in 1976.

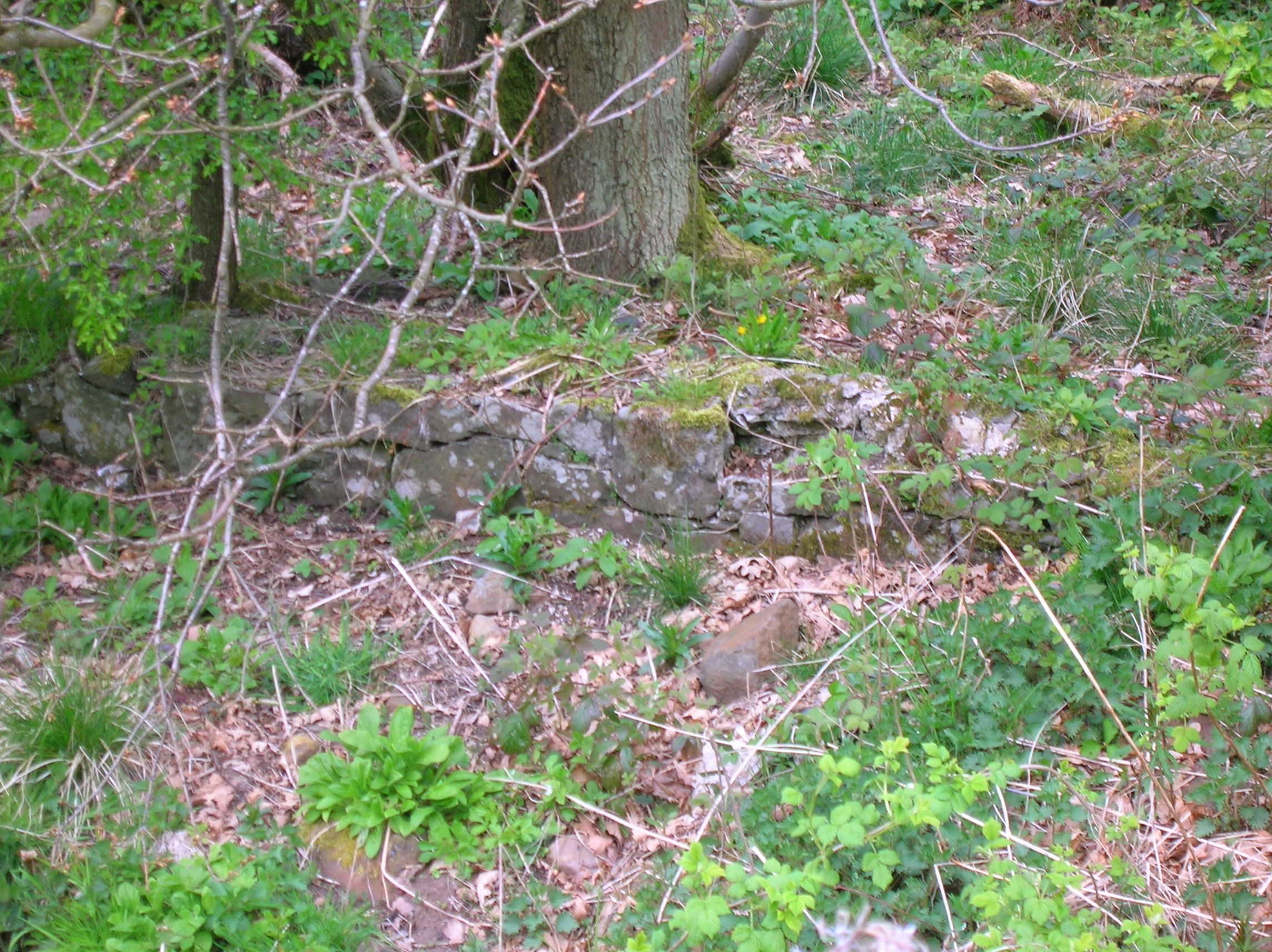
The old estate wall foundations at the Drukken Steps

The lower inscription (1927) on the commemorative cairn states:

Eglinton Woods, Drukken Steps (St Bryde's Well), Favourite Walk (1781–82) of Robert Burns and his sailor friend Richard Brown. "Do you recollect a Sunday we spent together in Eglinton Woods? R.B." 30 December 1787. Irvine Burns Club, 25 January 1927.

The upper inscription (1976) reads:

This cairn was erected for Irvine Burns Club to mark their 150th anniversary and to re-locate the plaque originally placed at the Drukken Steps (Drunken) / Saint Bride's Well. 700 yards north west of this spot by W & C French (Construction) Ltd, builders of Irvine by-pass, January 1976.

The 'Steps Road' in Irvine commemorates the Drukken steps.

== The stepping stones and the 1774 toll road ==
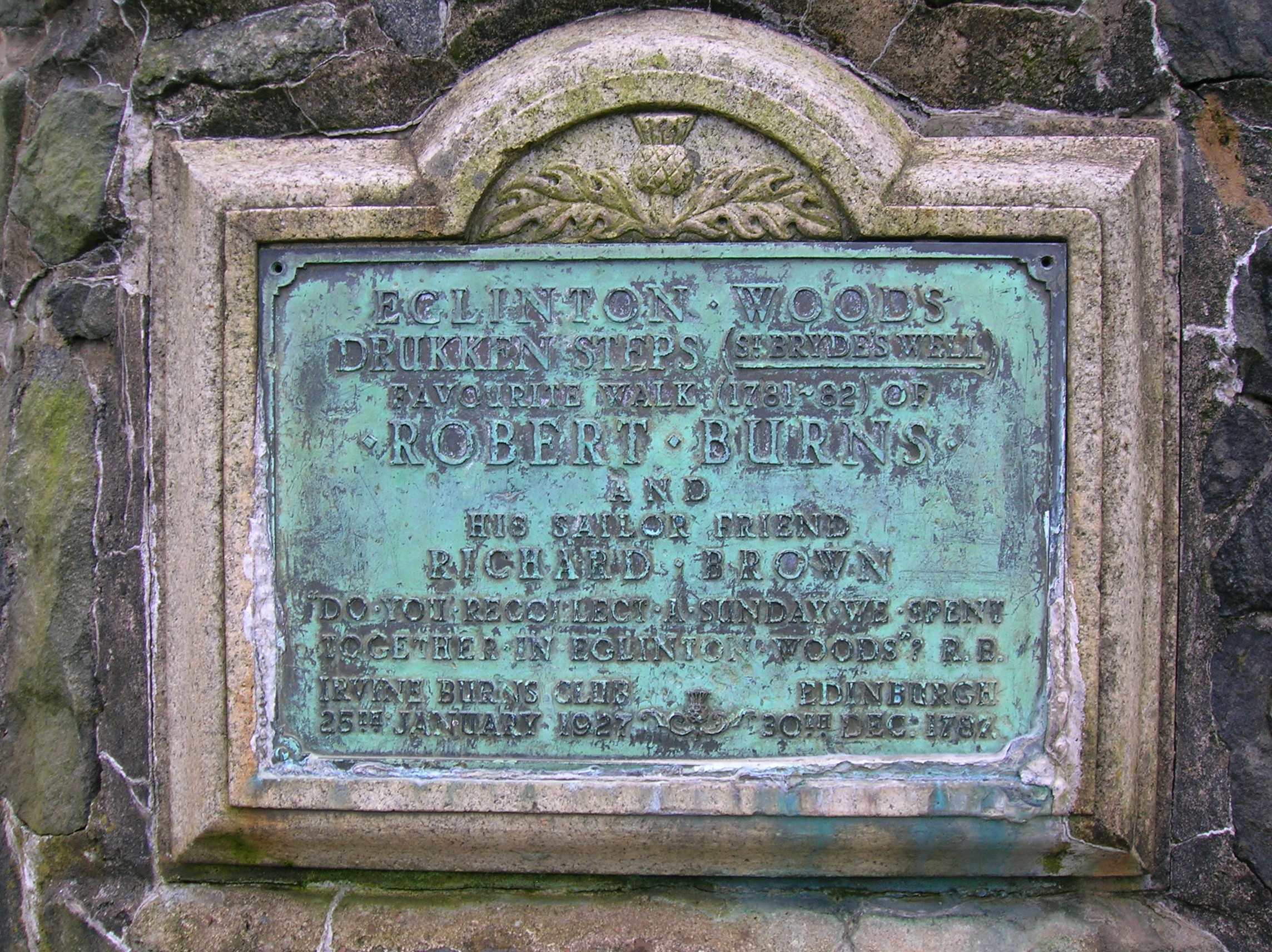
The commemorative plaque on the Drukken Cairn as first unveiled by Sir Andrew Duncan, Irvine Burns Club President.

The Drukken Steps therefore were stepping stones on the course of an old Road, later a Toll Road (1774), which ran from the west end of Irvine through the Eglinton policies to Kilwinning and Stevenston via Milnburn (sic) or Millburn; crossing the Red burn near Knadgerhill (previously Knadgar and pronounced 'Nygerhill' as in the country.) and running passed 'The Higgins' cottage, the 'Hygenhouse' of 1774, now demolished. The name may be a personal name or may relate to the Scots word for a fence or hedge as the building lay close to the boundary of the estate.55°37.902′N 004°39.355′W The Eglinton estate wall used to cut across the burn and join up with the perimeter wall of the cemetery. The remains of this wall can still be seen at the site of the stepping stones and it was to this wall that the original commemorative plaque had been attached. No gate or door existed here, entry being gained through a collapsed section. The nearby Knadgerhill Cemetery has one wall built from a continuation of this estate wall.

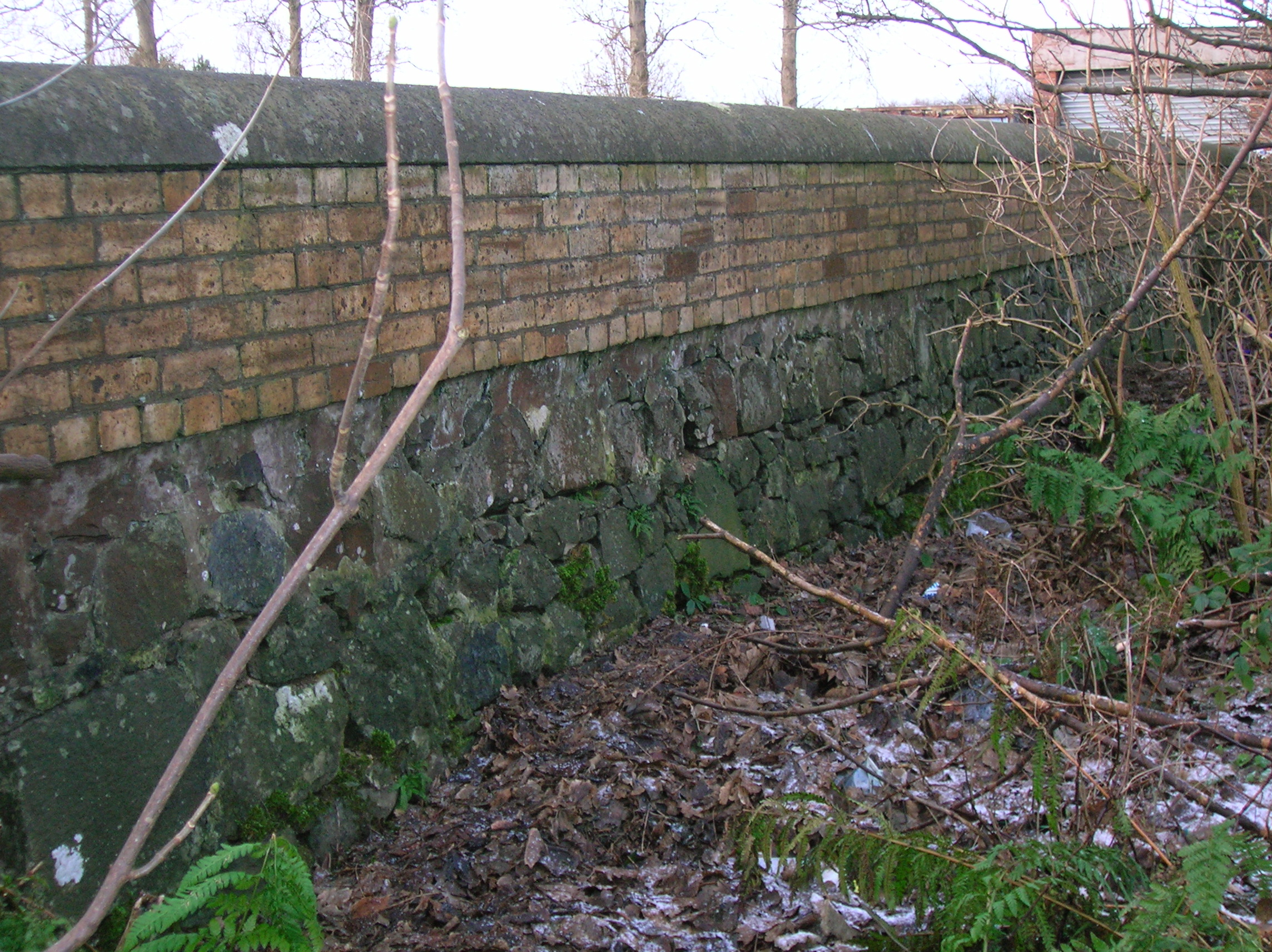
Knadgerhill Cemetery wall, incorporating the estate wall.

Land in the vicinity of the Drukken Steps was locally known as the Spittal Meadow, held in 1666 by the Laird of Corsbie or Crosbie and Robert Woodside or Robert of Woodside. Spittal was a term chiefly applied to lands, the revenues of which supported a hospice but, in some instances, the reference maybe to the site of a hospice for the infirm, lepers, etc. This name is also recorded in a document dated 1542. This could have formed part of the lands of the nunnery at Stanecastle which could have been the site of the spittal in question. Other spittals in Ayrshire were located in Ayr, Prestwick, Symington, Fail, Maybole, Mauchline, Stewarton and Kilmarnock.

A Chapel of Saint Bridget (capelle sancte Brigide) near Stanecastle is mentioned in 1417, however this seems to have been secularised by the early 17th century. A secondary source makes reference to a chapel at the site of the Hill Cottage and it is indicated that the well at this site produced an abundance of water. A Cruceford or Crossford was also located further down the Redburn on the Knights Templar lands of Redburn where the burn now crosses under the main road near Kidsneuk and Rood meadow. Roodmeadow was held by William Cuninghame and Robert Hamilton in 1666. The term 'rood' may refer to the True Cross, the specific wooden cross used in Christ's crucifixion; the name 'Red' may also derive from this.

Knadgerhill was only acquired by the Earls of Eglinton in 1851 when the burgh excambied part of the lands of Bogside Flats for them. This allowed the construction of the new entrance to the policies at Stanecastle via Long Drive.

Coal heughs were shallow pits and in 1686 they had been sunk at Doura and Armsheugh, the coal being taken down to Irvine via the Drukken steps or via Stanecastle.

== The association with Robert Burns ==
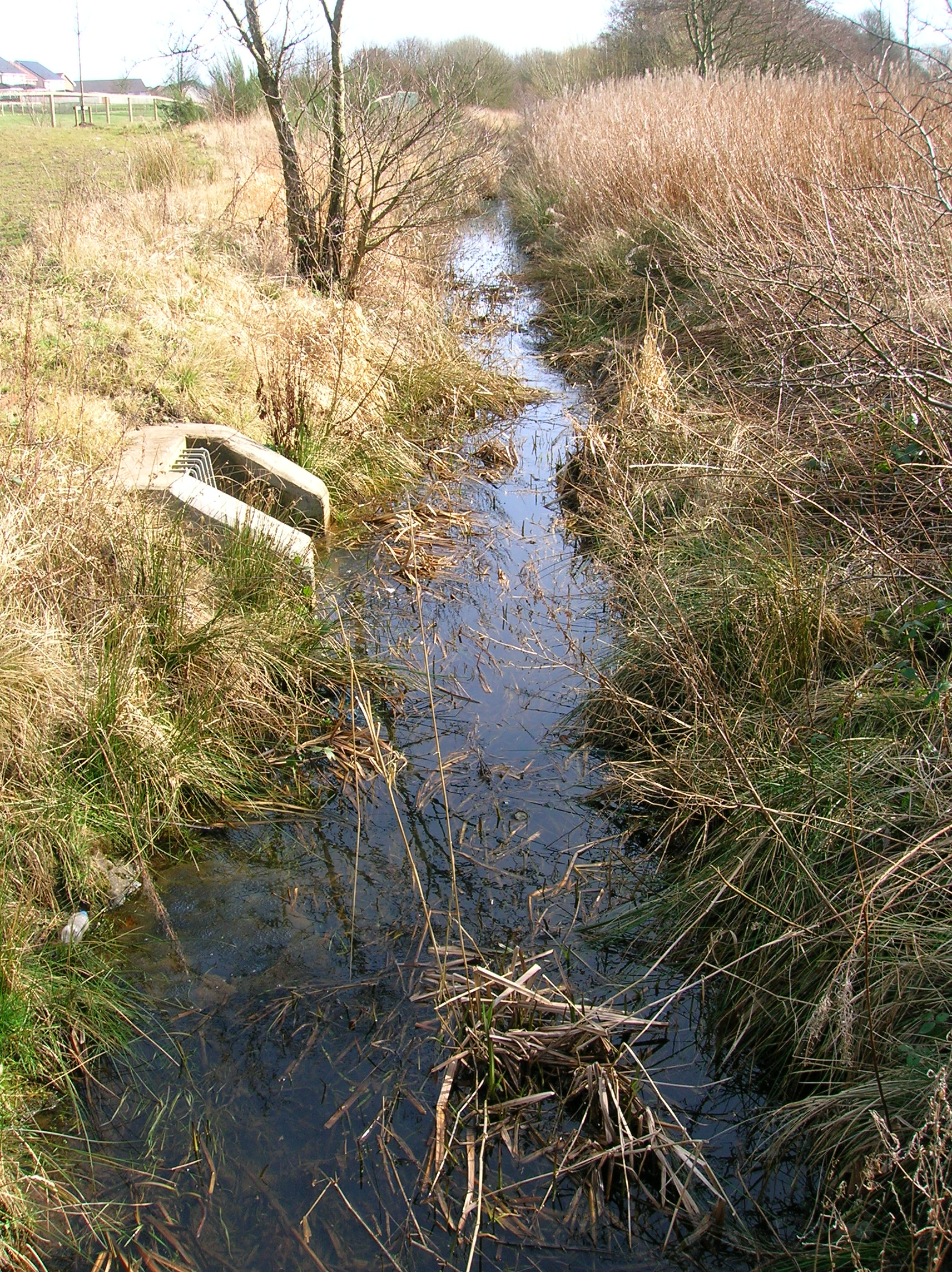
The Red Burn from the Drukken Steps.

During the years 1781–82 Robert Burns lived in Irvine, During this time he took regular walks into the Eglinton Woods via the old Irvine to Kilwinning toll road and the Drukken (Drunken) Steps and back via the site of the old Saint Brides or Bryde's Well at Stanecastle.

Robert Burns wrote to Richard Brown or Ritchie Broun (1753–1833), on 30 December 1787, saying ..do you remember a Sunday we spent together in Eglinton Woods? You told me, on my repeating some verses to you that you wondered I could resist the temptation of sending verses of such merit to a magazine. Burns wrote the following to Brown, Twas actually this that gave me an idea of my own pieces which encouraged me to endeavour at the character of a Poet.

Higgens House existed as far back as 1761 and would have been familiar to users of the old road during Burns' time in Irvine, however in 1799 the earl closed this route and provided a diversion via Knadgerhill.

== The sites of the Drukken Steps and Saint Bride's well ==
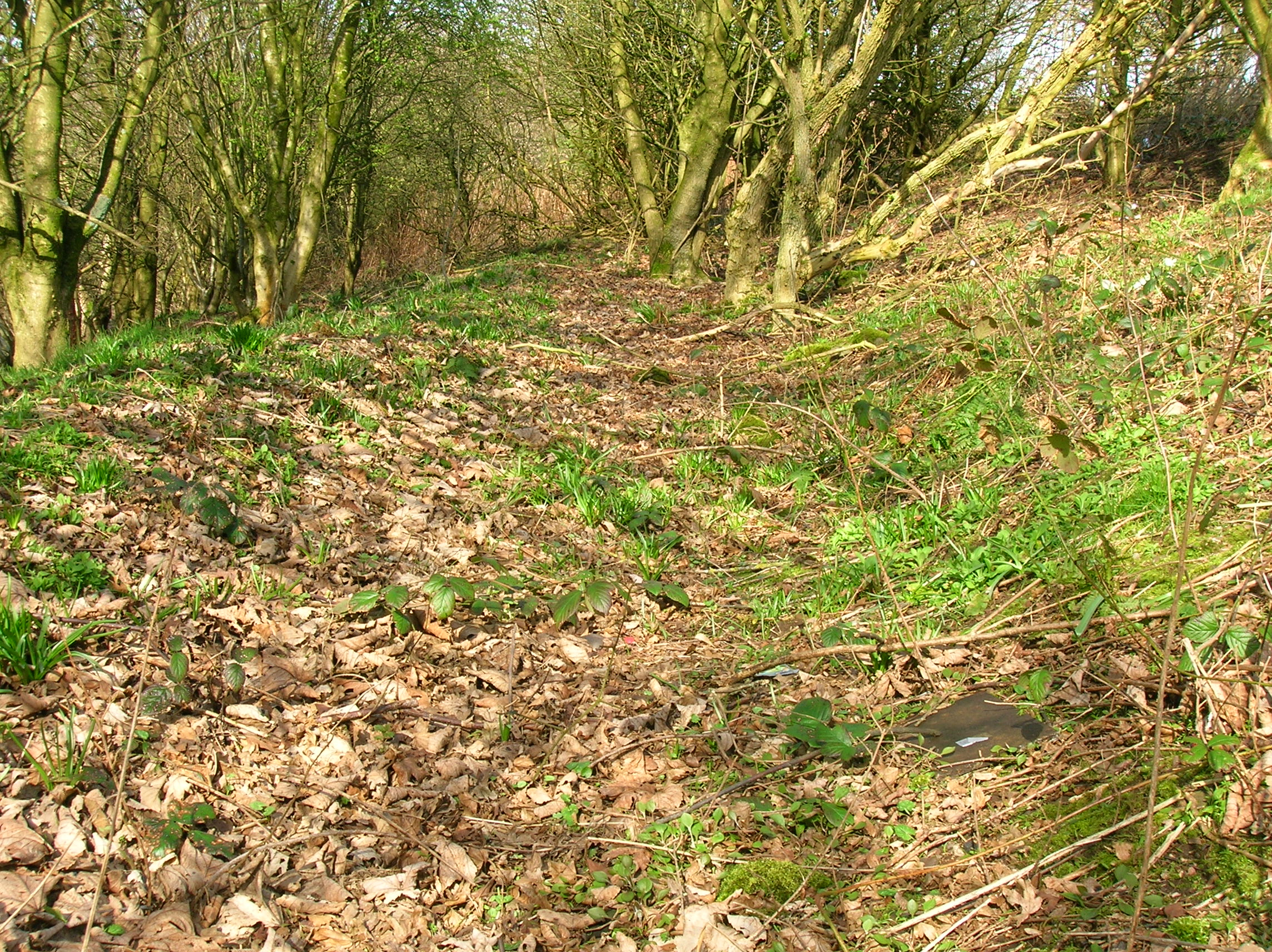
An old path in the Higgins Plantation

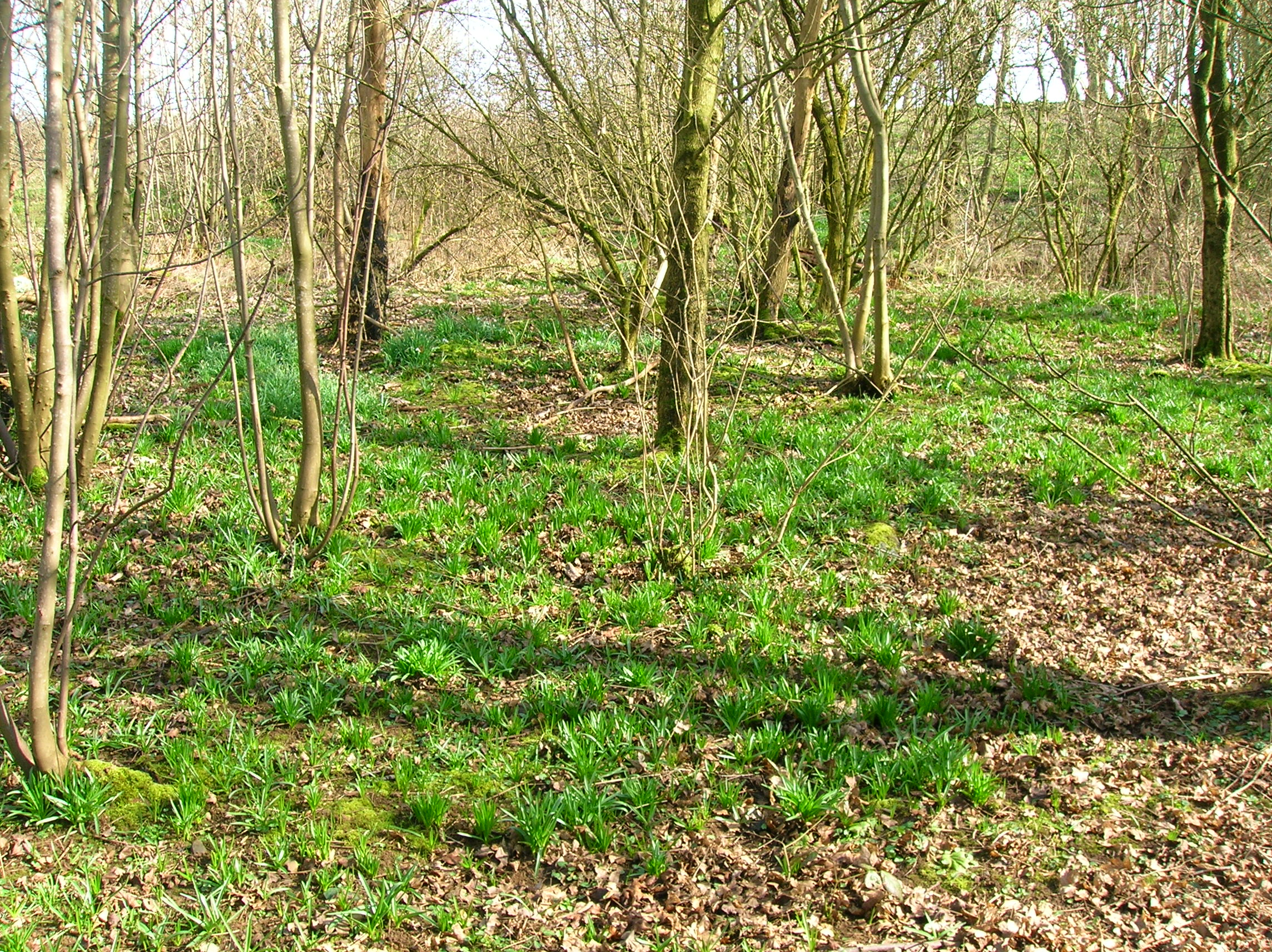
A view of the bluebell woodlands at Higgins Plantation

The site of the old toll road crossing of the Red Burn is still extant near the original Eglinton Estate's Long Drive and the site of Saint Bride's well, now covered over, was at Stanecastle as is shown on the first edition of the OS map. The well site may even have been near the Annick Water.

The commemorative cairn carries the re-located 1927 plaque that was attached to the now demolished estate boundary wall. The Drukken Steps / Saint Bride's Well site still exists, much altered. The 1966 1:2500 map shows the Drukken Steps in a position that still exists as a small wooden bridge and this has confirmed by several local people who knew the old ford when the stepping stones and boundary wall were still in existence.

The reference to Saint Bride's Well at Stanecastle may reflect the poet and his companion's logical return journey via Millburn, Auchenwincie, Sourlie, Littlestane, Girdle Gate, Stanecastle and then back to the old Toll Road and into Irvine.

In 1761 the council records state that the "low ground of the Knadgerhill from the Drunken Steps near Higgens House southwards and to the east to the march with Stanecastle has been surveyed and laid out in eight plots". As previously stated, In 1851 this land became part of the Eglinton Estate after the earl exchanged or excambied land at Bogside for this property, allowing him to build 'Long Drive' and a new controlled entrance, the Stanecastle Gates.

== See also ==
- Eglinton Country Park
- Robert Burns
- Robert Burns and the Eglinton Estate
