= Girdle Toll =

Coordinates: 55.6201°N 04.6614°W

Girdle Toll: The Gurdel
- Location within North Ayrshire
- OS grid reference: NS325395
- Council area: North Ayrshire
- Lieutenancy area: Ayrshire and Arran
- Country: Scotland
- Sovereign state: United Kingdom
- Post town: IRVINE
- Postcode district: KA11, KA12
- Dialling code: 01294
- Police: Scotland
- Fire: Scottish
- Ambulance: Scottish
- UK Parliament: Central Ayrshire
- Scottish Parliament: Cunninghame South

Girdle Toll is an area of Irvine, North Ayrshire.

== Geography ==
Girdle Toll is located east of the Stanecastle Roundabout located next to the Stanecastle Keep. This area of Irvine is 10 miles (16 kilometres) from Prestwick Airport and 23 miles (37 kilometres) from Glasgow. Nearby is Eglinton Country Park. The central part of Girdle Toll is located off of the Lochilbo Road and Girdle Toll; it previously formed part of the A736 route to Glasgow. The A736 now bypasses the area just to the west.

== Schools ==
- Annick Primary
- Lawthorn Primary and Nursery
- Stanecastle Nursery and School for special needs children was demolished in 2022.
- First Steps Nursery

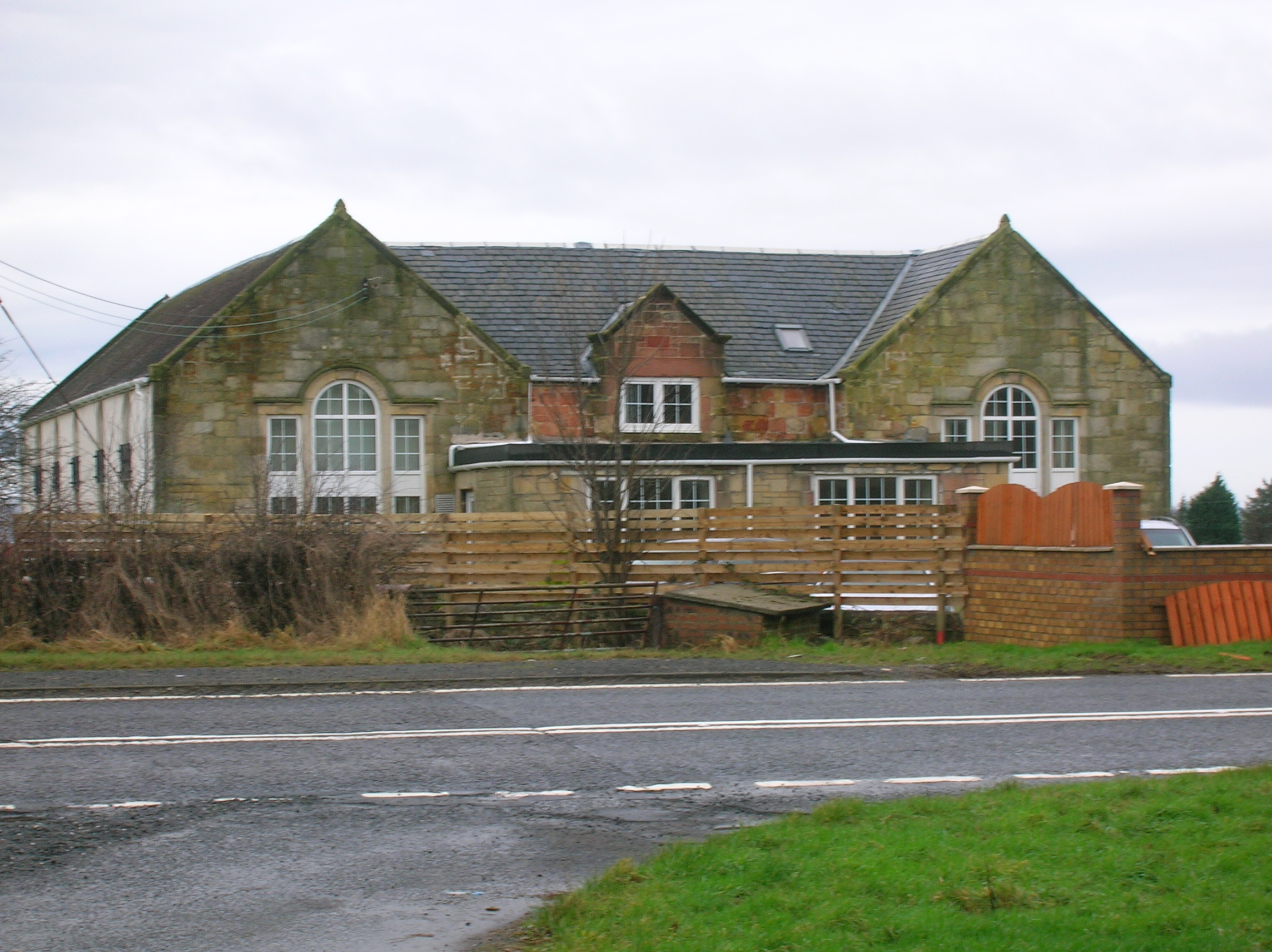
The Original Annick Primary School. The picture shows the old school, which subsequently was converted to a pub and then to a private house

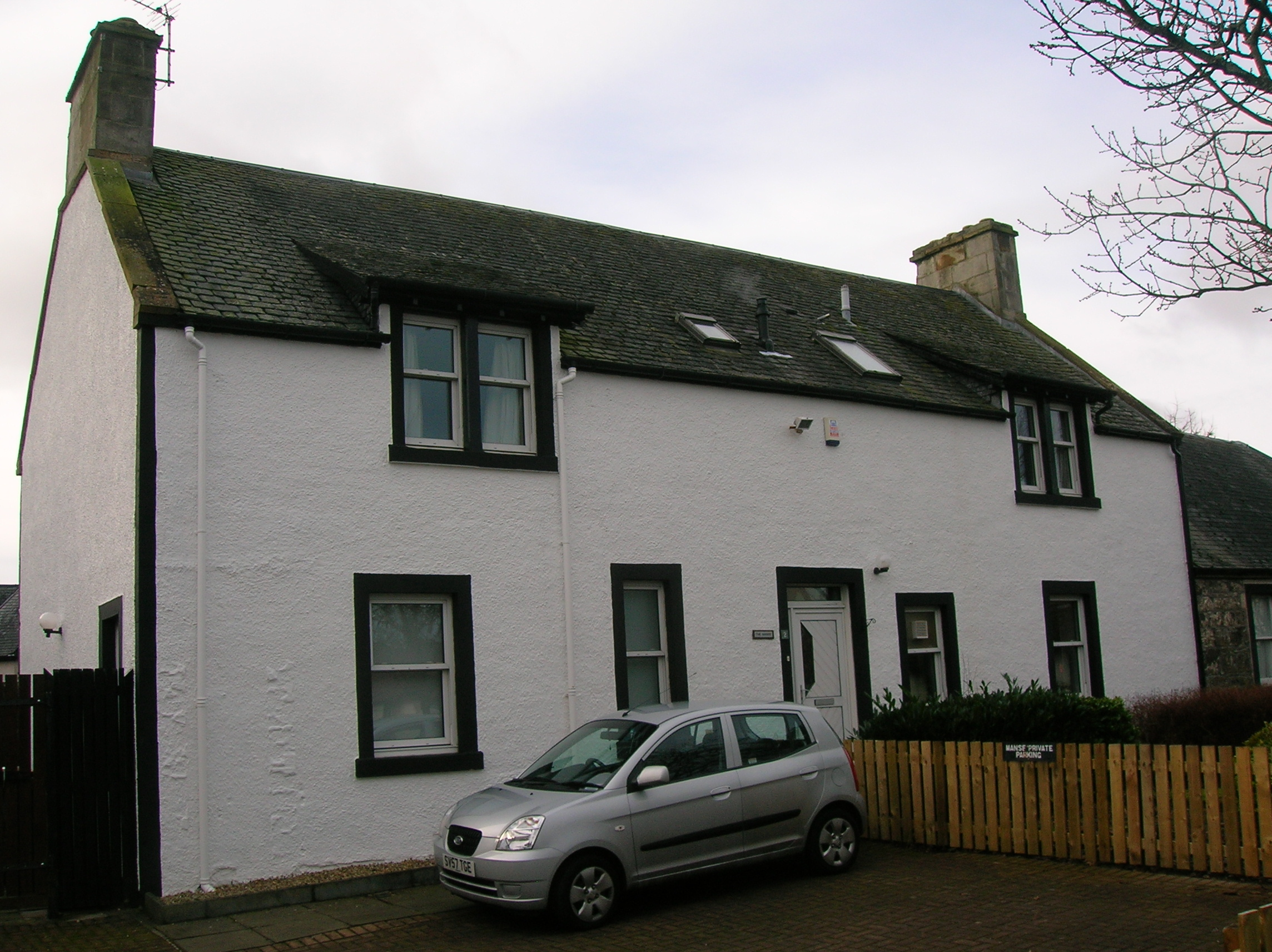
Littlestane Farmhouse, now Girdle Toll Church manse.

Annick Primary School and Stanecastle School stood within the same grounds as each other, they were merely 100m apart from each other. The children from Annick Primary School occasionally visited Stanecastle School from time to do activities with the special needs children. The schools were built in 1979, with Stanecastle School being demolished in 2022. Annick Primary is situated in the fields between Bensley Rise and Burns Crescent.

Lawthorn Primary School is situated close to the Spar shop and pharmacy at the Littlestane roundabout at the top of the Girdle Toll Road, you pass it when you head along the old Glasgow Road. Lawthorn Primary School was built in 2000 to relieve the slightly overcrowded Annick Primary School. It now has over double the number of pupils than Annick Primary has.

== Annick Water ==
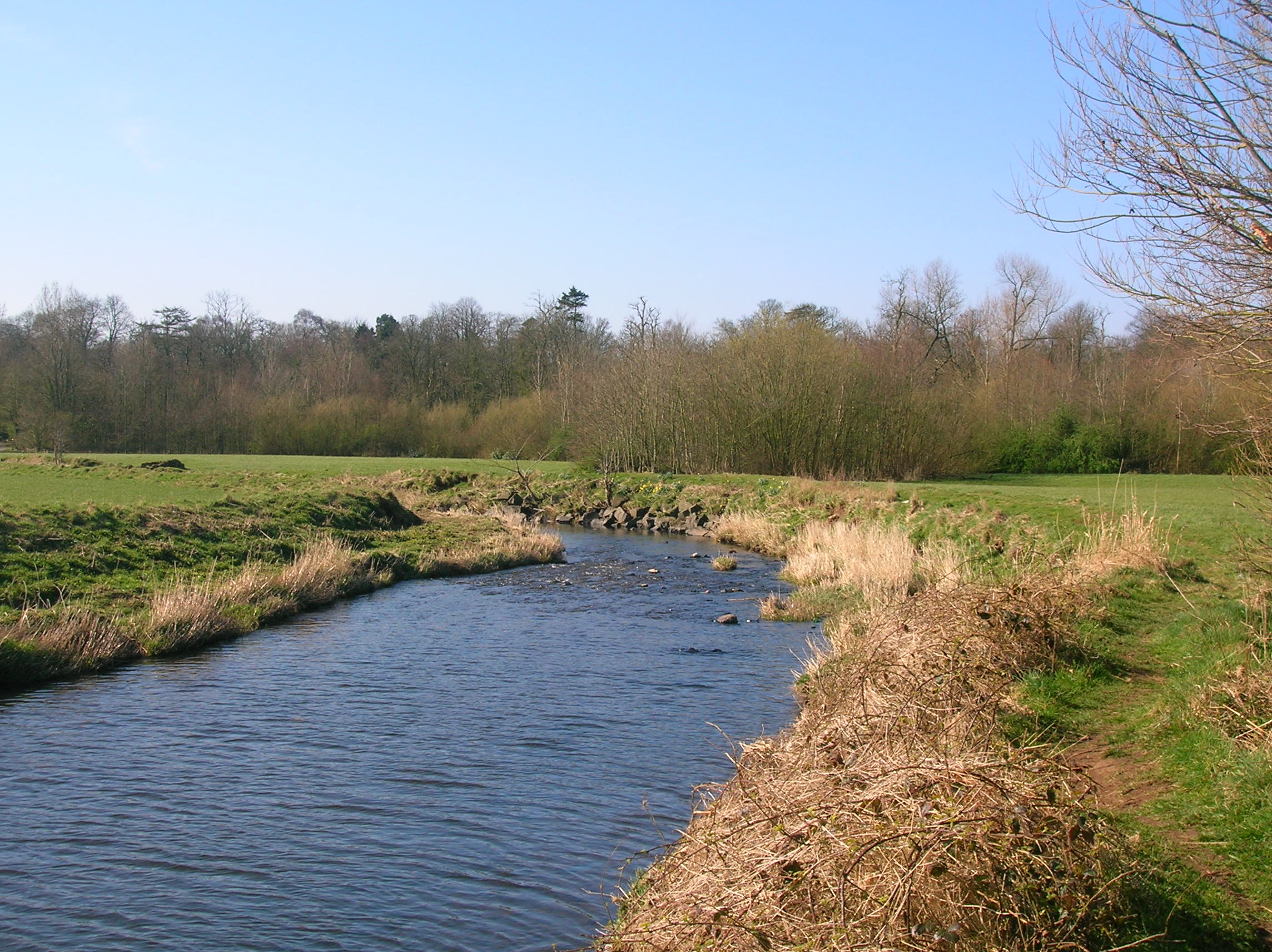
The Annick Water at Bourtreehill

The Annick Water passes through Girdle Toll which also flows through Bourtreehill and passes by the outskirts of Eglinton Country Park. The river is well known for having a healthy stock of trout and salmon during the fishing season. The river is known to be mostly pollution free.

== Irvine New Town Trail ==
The Irvine New Town Trail passes through Girdle Toll, it forms part of the British National Cycle Network with routes 7 and 73 forming part of the route. The route forms a ring around the town and passes through Eglinton Country Park, Kilwinning, Bourtreehill, Dreghorn and passes through the town centre of Irvine. It connects to route 7 which is used by locals cycling/walking to nearby Troon and Ayr.

== History ==
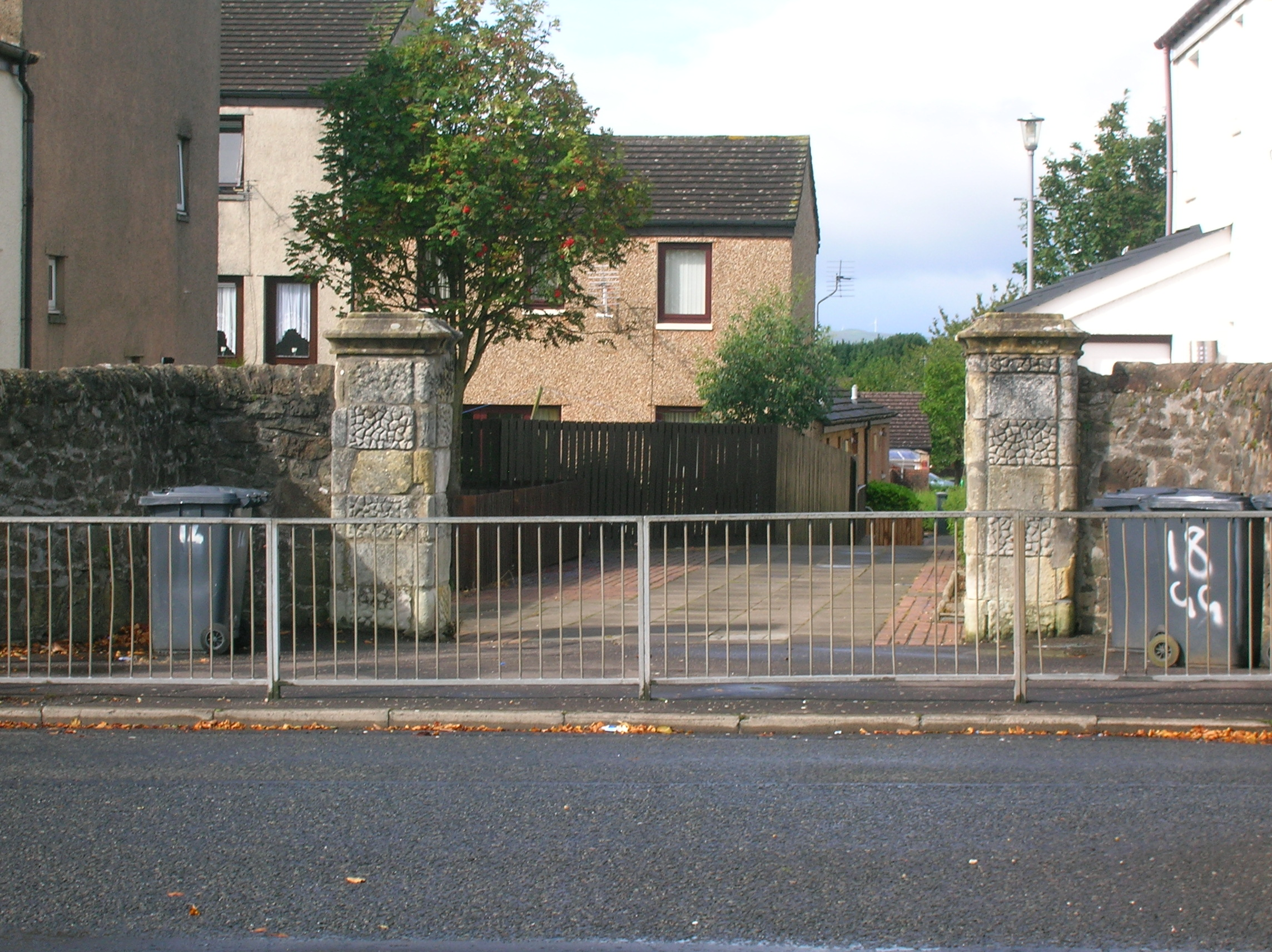
The old Girdle gate into the Eglinton Castle estate. The old gatehouse has been demolished.

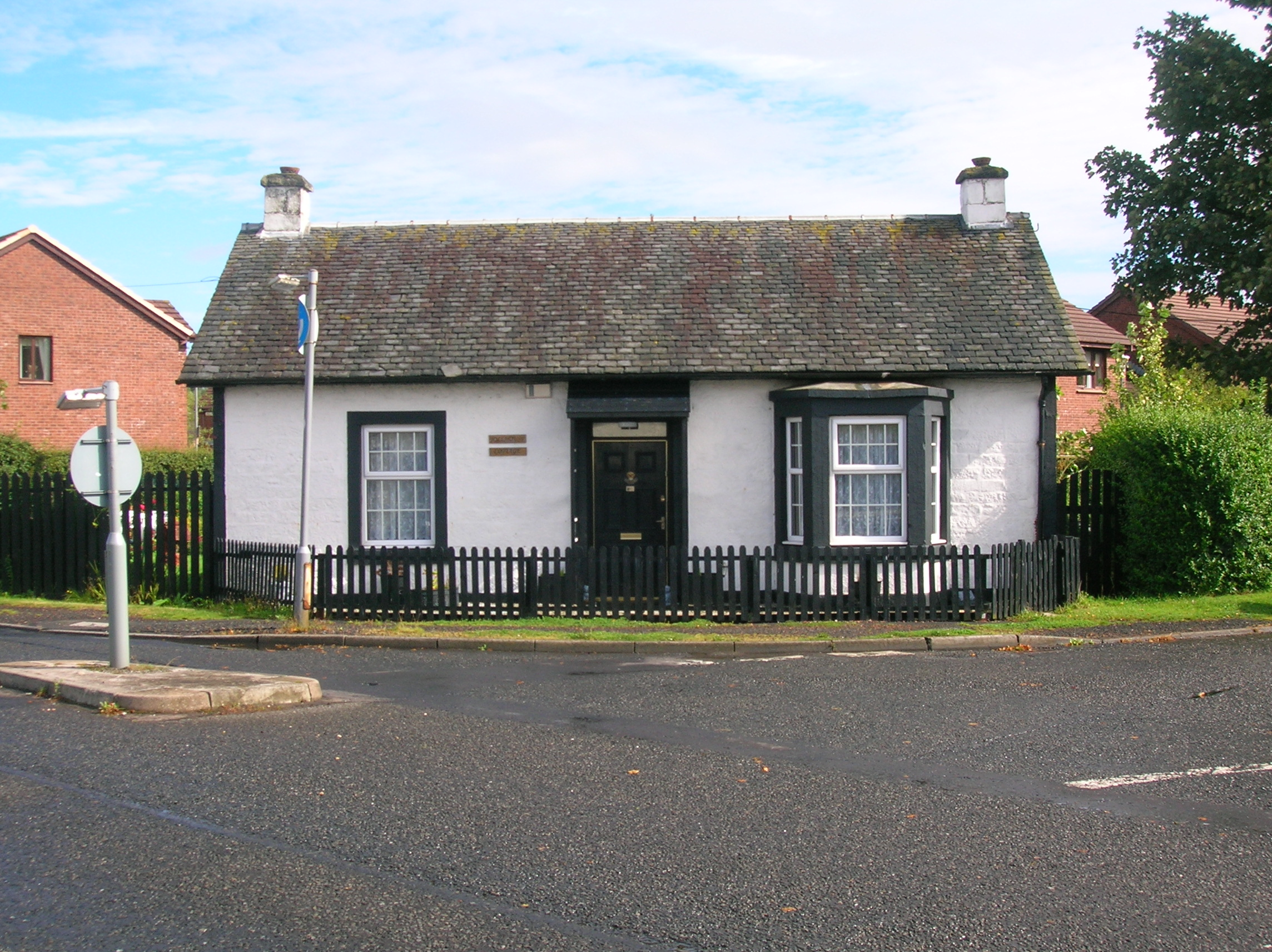
The Tollhouse Cottage(2007)

Before Girdle Toll was developed by Irvine Development Corporation (IDC), Girdle Toll was just a row of houses next to large areas of farmland. In the 1970s and 1980s IDC decided to develop the land into a large housing area with local amenities. Girdle Toll has been growing since, the most recent area to have houses built was in 2001 when a small development was built next to Bryce Knox court.

Littlestane Loch, now mostly drained, was once located nearby, drained by the Red Burn and fed by drainage, rainfall and natural springs. Littlestane Farm stood at the top of the loch.

=== Prehistory ===
John Smith in 1895 records that the GIRDLE stood 3 furlongs to the south-west of Lawthorn Mound and appears to have been so well constructed that it was the admiration of everyone who saw it. A Mr.Rodger, manager of Fergushill Colliry, recollected that the mound was about 30 feet in diameter and 3 feet high; surrounded by a turf dyke and a thorn fence, outside of which were a number of trees, mostly beech. The Girdle Mound was completely levelled circa 1860. This mound gave the name to the toll and then the area.

== See also ==
- Annick Water
- River Irvine
- Bourtreehill House
- Irvine New Town Trail
- Eglinton Castle
- Eglinton Country Park
