= Littlestane Loch =

Former lake in Irvine, Scotland

Coordinates: 55°38′2.5″N 4°38′19.6″W

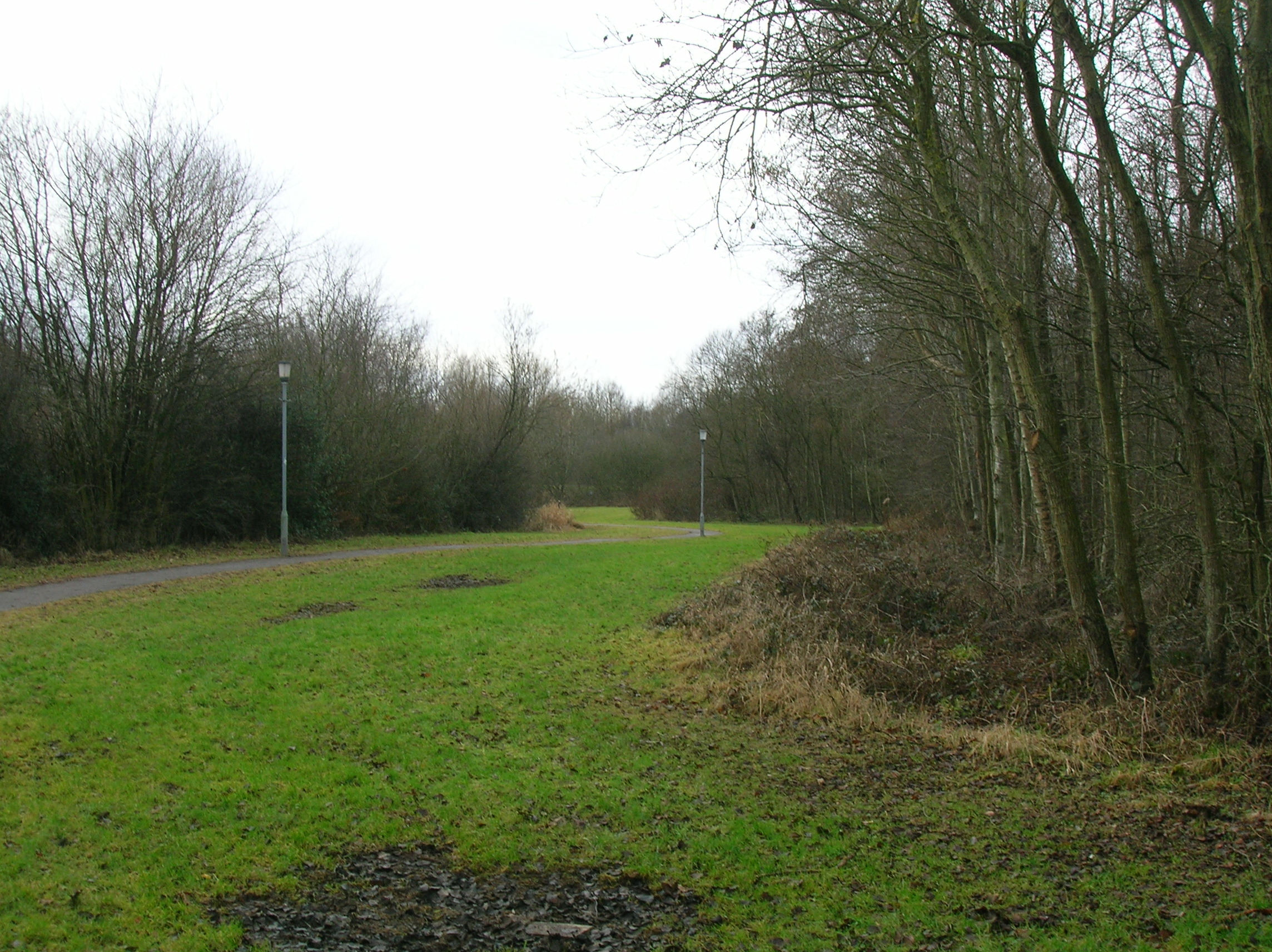
- The site of Littlestane Loch

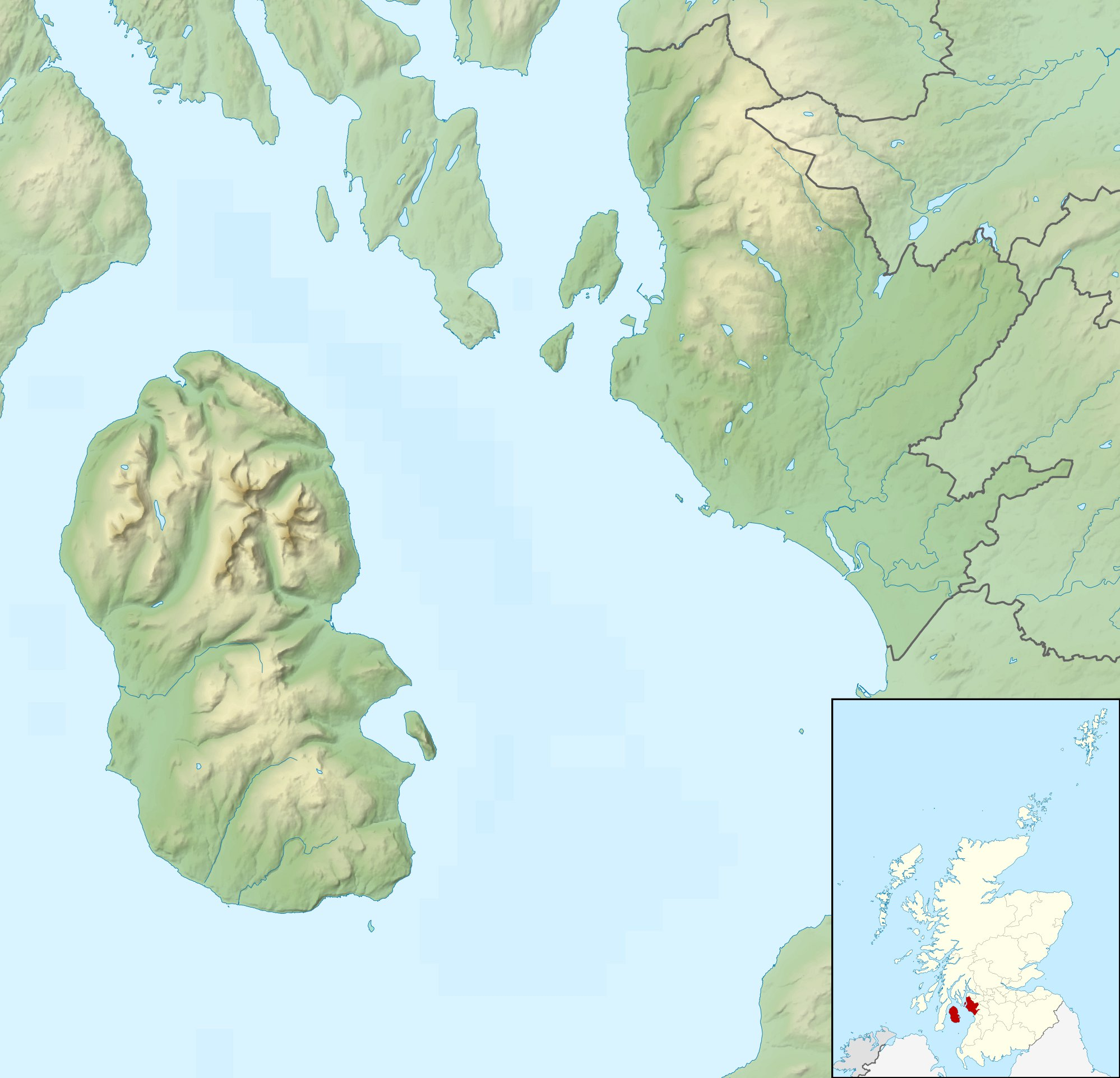
- Location within North Ayrshire
- Location: Stanecastle, North Ayrshire, Scotland
- Type: Drained freshwater loch
- Primary inflows: Rainfall, springs and runoff
- Primary outflows: Red Burn
- Basin countries: Scotland
- Islands: None
- Settlements: Irvine

Littlestane Loch, was situated in the mid-Ayrshire clayland near Stanecastle, Irvine, North Ayrshire, Scotland. It is nowadays (2011) only visible as an area of permanent water in the Scottish Wildlife Trust Sourlie Nature Reserve. The loch was natural, sitting in a hollow created by glaciation. The loch waters outflow was via the Red Burn that flows into the River Garnock. The site of Littlestane Loch site is partly built over and much of the site is now public open space lying within the Parish of Girdle Toll.

== History ==
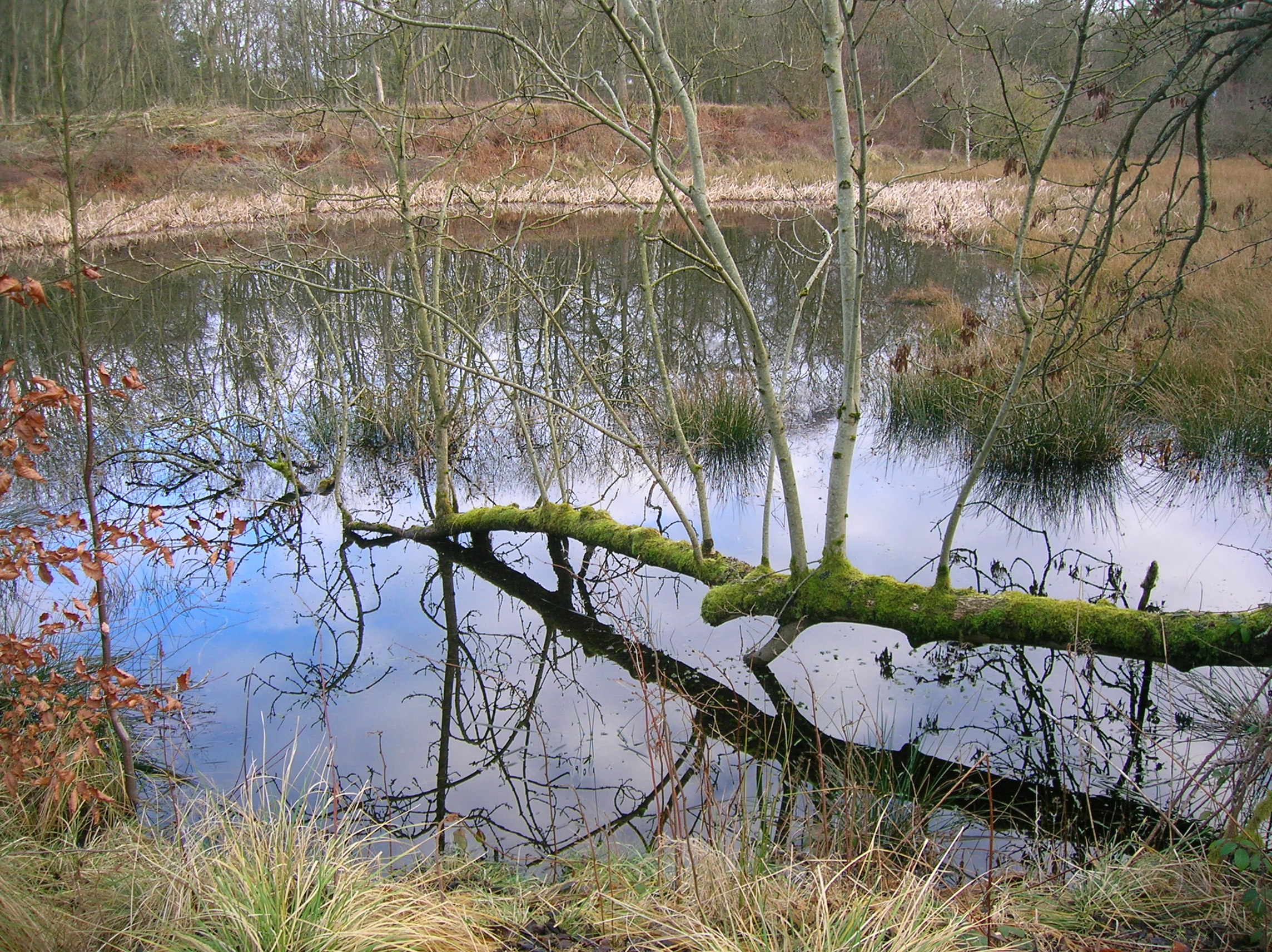
Sourlie pond on the site of the old loch.

Blaeu's map of 1654, derived from the early 1600s survey by Timothy Pont shows the loch as a substantial oval shaped body of water with an outflow via the Red Burn. Direct rainfall and runoff were the main inflows. Roy's map of 1747-55 clearly marks the loch, although much reduced in extent. A Loch Wards habitation is marked in the vicinity of the old loch.

Littlestane Farm, recorded as 'Litle Stain' is marked as being on the northern end of Littlestane Loch in the 1600s, however by the 1750s the farmstead was no longer on its edge due to its contraction. Related placenames on Pont's map are 'Lichmil' or Loch Mill and 'Thurland' or Thirled land.

Ordnance Survey maps of the 19th century show the loch site as a marshy area extending into the Sourlie Woods and as an area of marshy land close to Lawthorn Wood.

The old Irvine Burgh boundary is marked on OS maps as running up the Red Burn, then following the curve of the old Littlestane lochshore before extending through the old Sourlie Woods site.

In 1845 the loch was used for a curling match between Dundonald and a Monkton and Prestwick team. Dundonald won by 91 shots with 32 players on each team. The loch was recorded as Sourley Loch.

=== The draining of Littlestane Loch ===
The outflow of this shallow loch was into the Red Burn, which now is now piped in the vicinity of the loch and downstream only flows in a canalised form, diverted in places, into the River Garnock. The Perceton Branch of the Glasgow and South Western Railway ran across the site, as does the A736 Lochlibo Road. A mineral line is shown in 1910 running to Fergushill Collieries numbers 29 and 30, the railway embankment being built across the loch bed.

As stated, the loch shrunk between 1600 and the 1750s, existing only as marshy areas on the first OS maps of the 1850s and not featuring on maps of the early 1800s.

The loch's drainage may have begun in the 18th century when Alexander Montgomerie, 10th Earl of Eglinton, was pursuing a number of agricultural improvements on his extensive estates. Intensive drainage work may have taken place in the 1740s as part of the improvements undertaken to provide employment for Irish Montgomerie estate workers during the Irish potato famines of the 1740s and the mid 19th centuries. Many drainage schemes also date to the end of World War I when many soldiers returned en masse to civilian life.

Previous location of Littlestane Loch, North Ayrshire

=== The Drukken Steps ===
A minor link with Robert Burns is the existence of the nearby site of the Drukken Steps over the Red Burn in the old Eglinton Woods near Stanecastle at NS 329 404, was a favourite haunt of Robert Burns and his friend Richard Brown whilst the two were in Irvine in 1781 - 82.

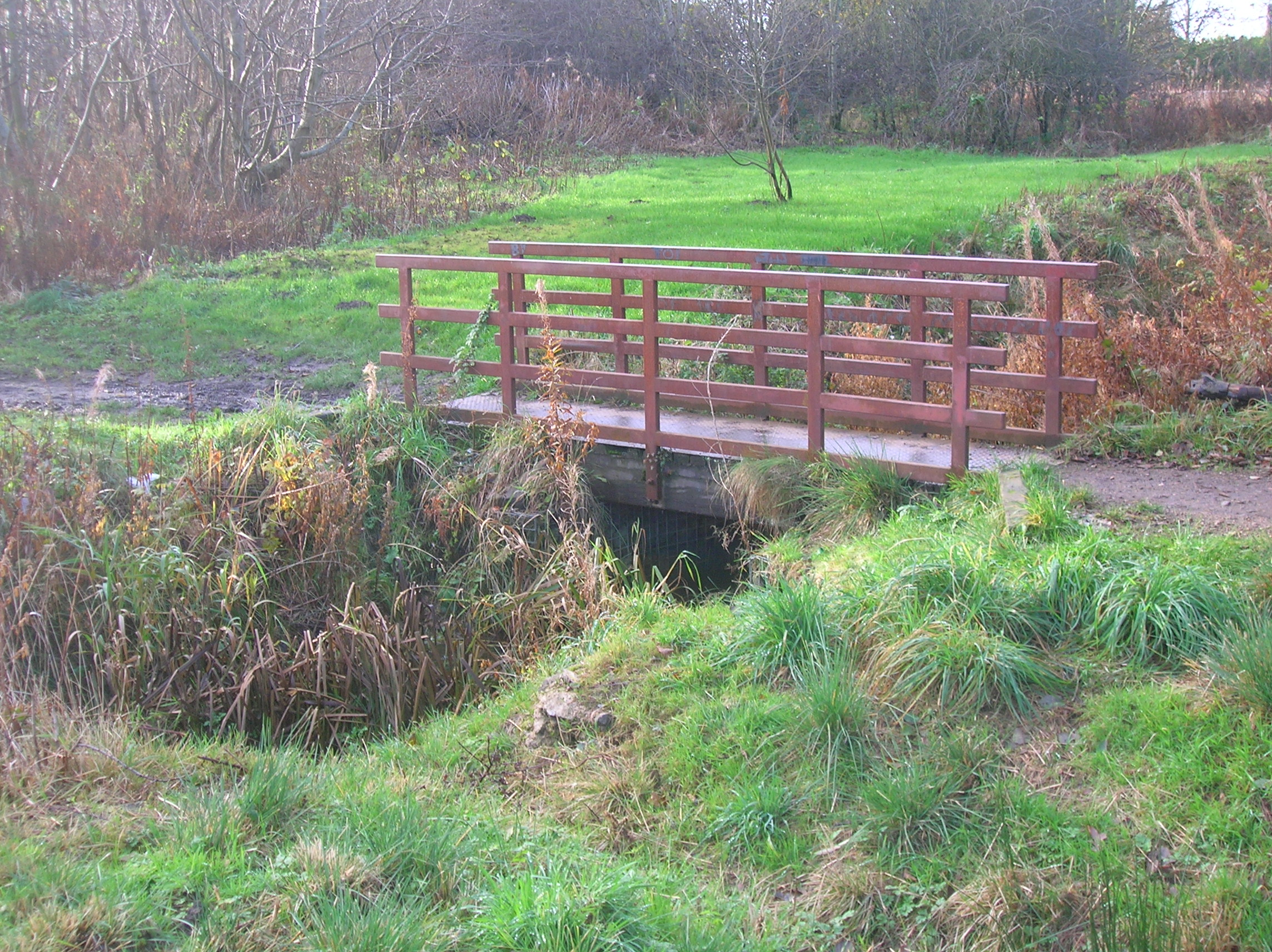
The site of the Drukken Steps over the Red Burn on the 1774 Toll road to Millburn via Higgens House.

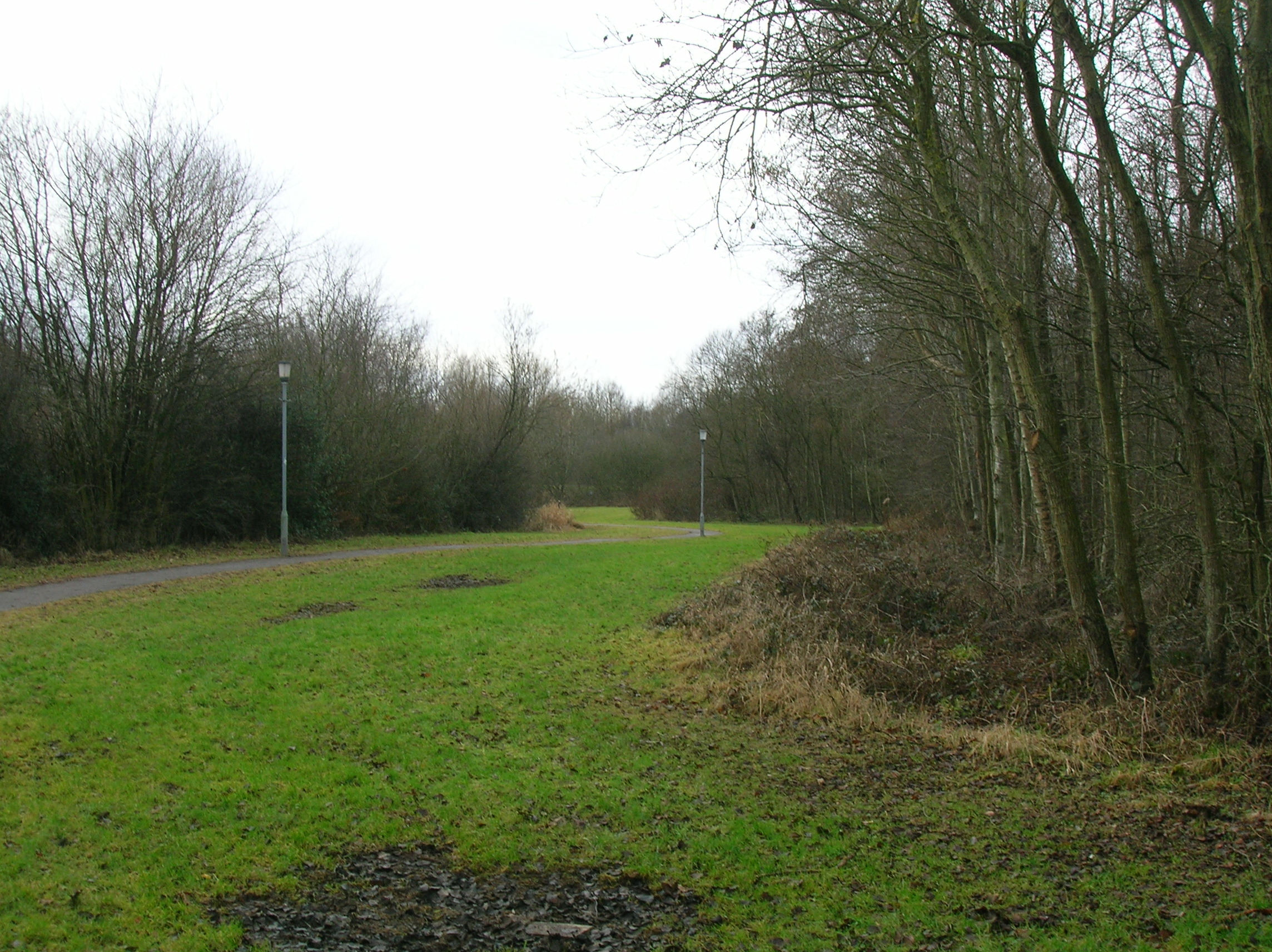
Littlestane Farmhouse, now the manse for Girdle Toll Parish Church.

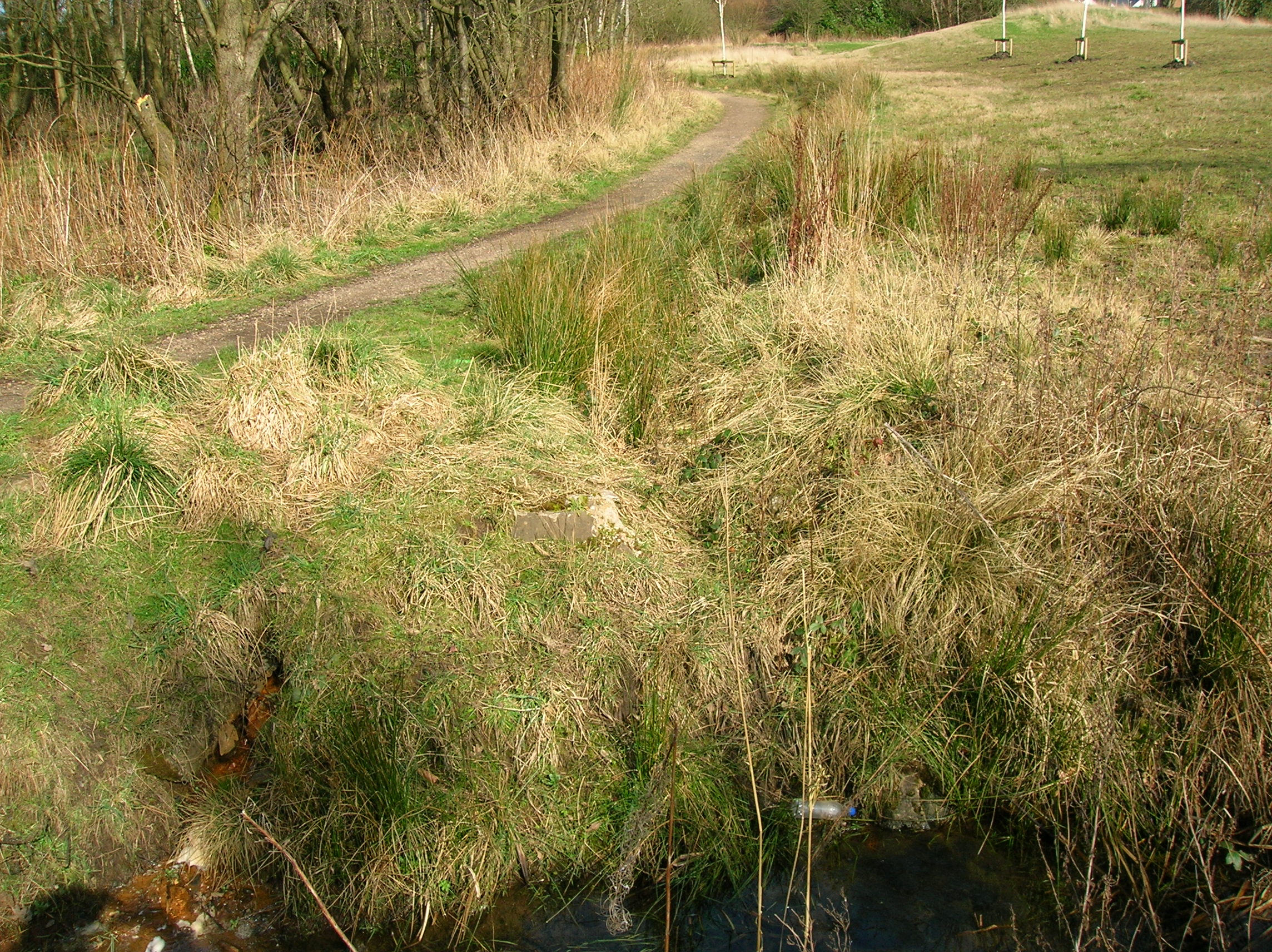
The 1960s bridge abutment at the site of the old Drukken Steps with the old Toll Road route in the background.

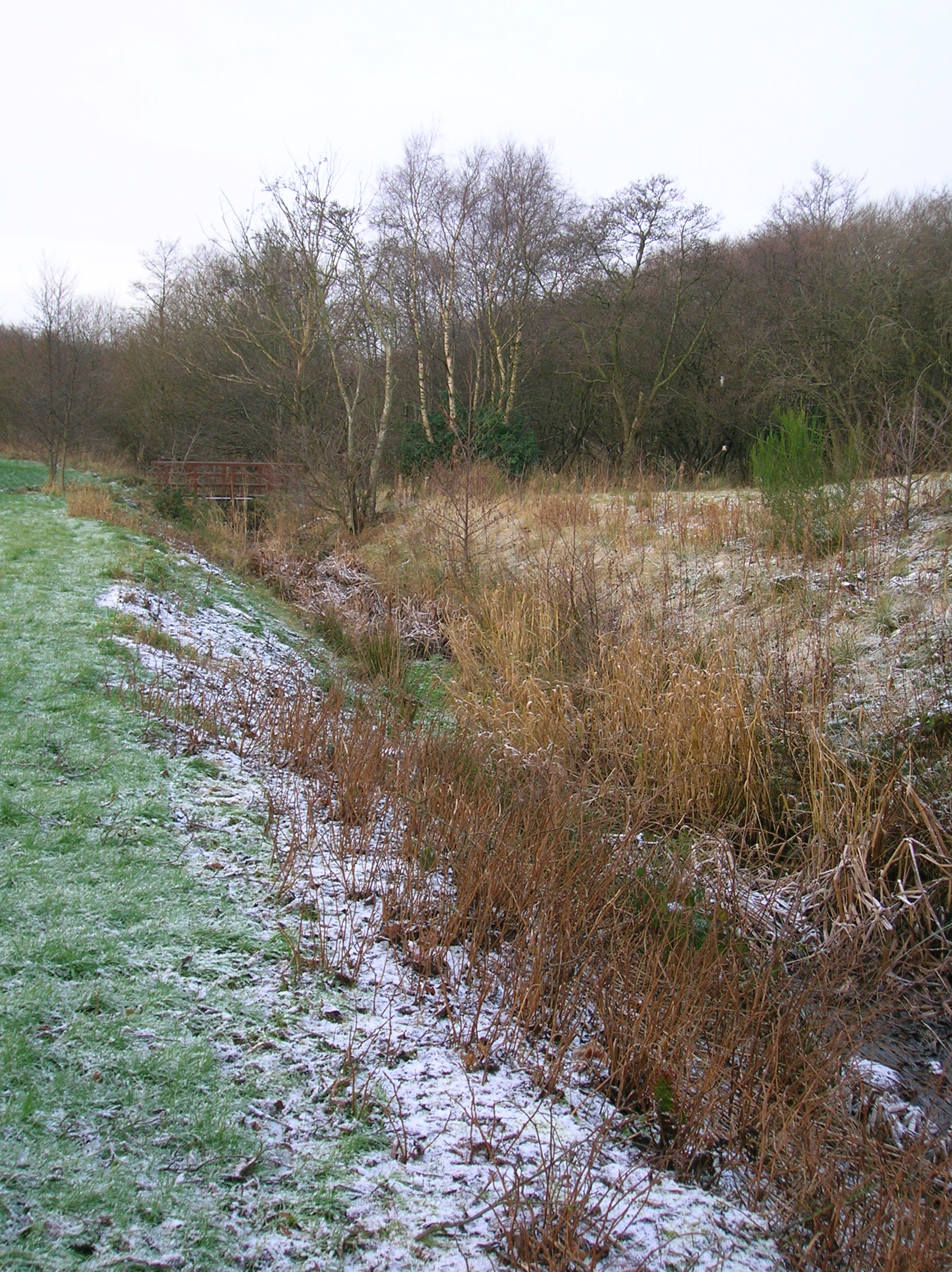
The site of the Drukken Steps and the canalised Red Burn.

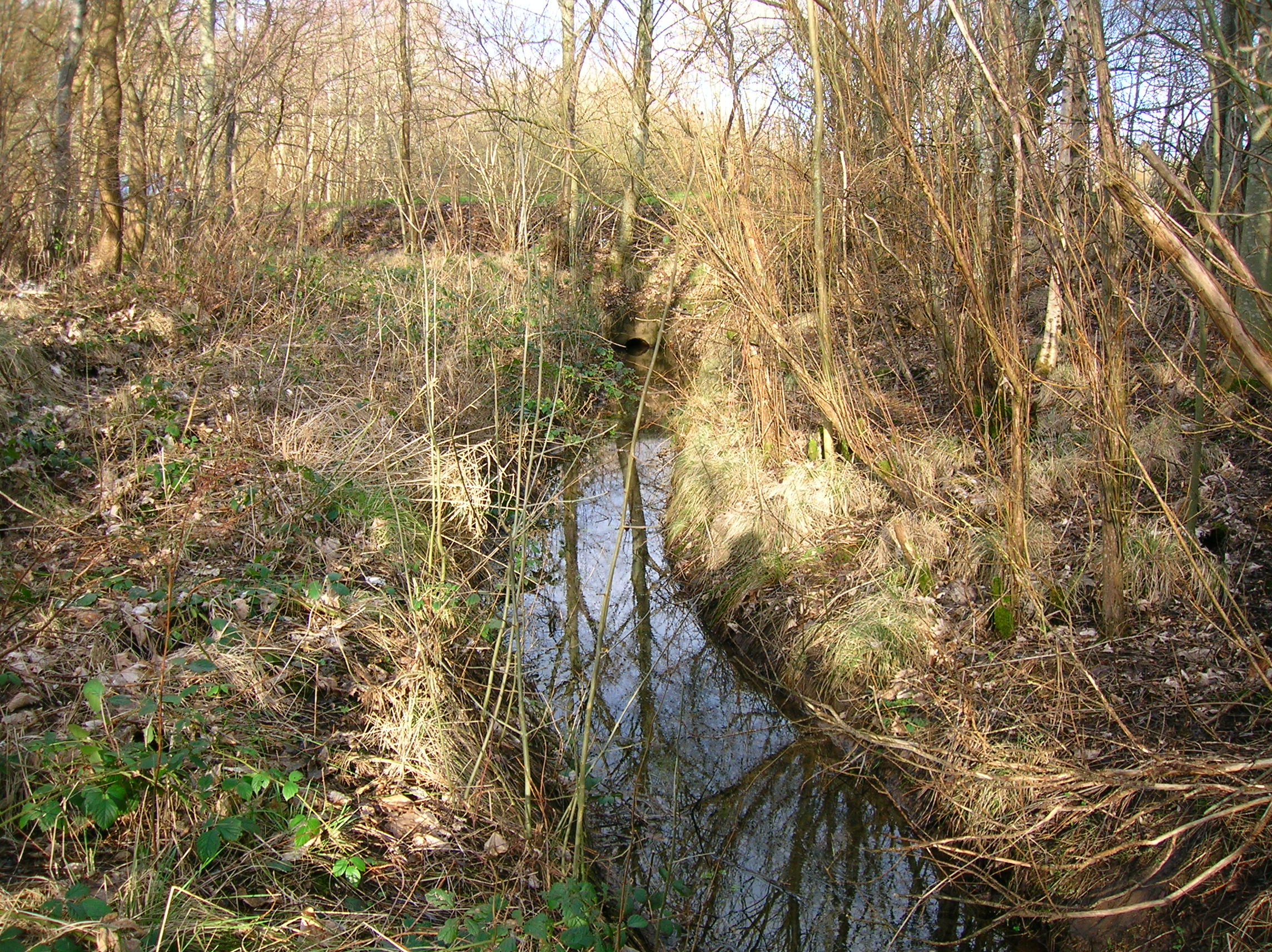
The Red Burn near The Hill Roundabout.
