= Stepping stones =

Set of stones used for crossing water

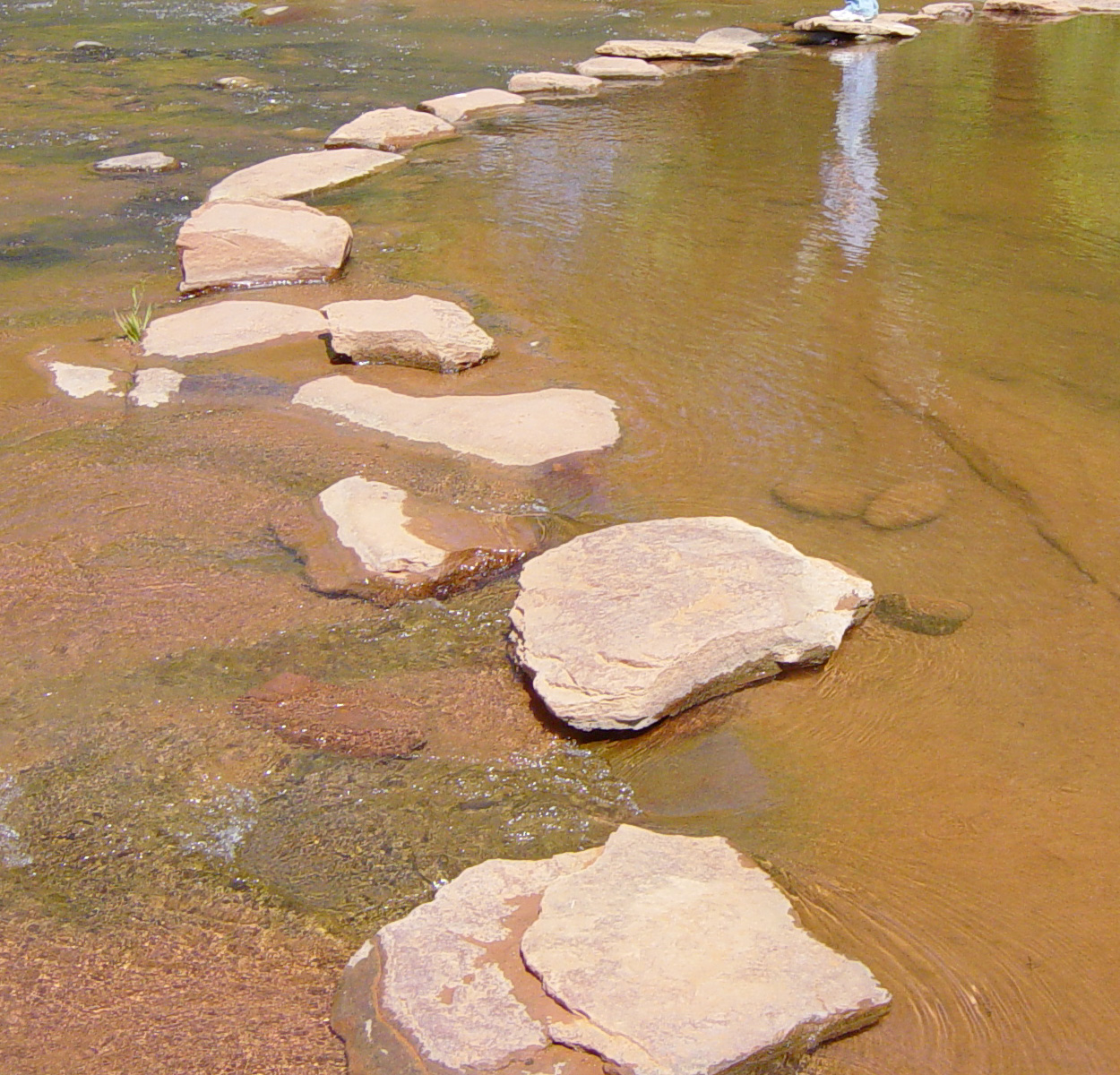
- A rustic stepping stone bridge across a stream.
- Ancestor: None, this is one of the few foundational types, but see also: ford (crossing).
- Related: Natural stepping stone stream crossing
- Descendant: Clapper bridge, Zig-zag bridge, Log bridge
- Carries: Pedestrians
- Span range: Has no spans, but stones must be spaced to allow water flow and a comfortable step or leap
- Material: Selected stone
- Movable: No
- Design effort: Low-rustic to Artisan applied art design
- Falsework required: No

Stepping stones or stepstones are sets of stones arranged to form an improvised causeway that allows a pedestrian to cross a natural watercourse such as a creek, a small river; or a water feature in a garden where water is allowed to flow between stone steps. Unlike bridges, stepstone crossings typically have no spans, although wood planks or stone slabs can be placed over between the stones (which serve as the piers) to improvise as low-water bridges. Although their historical origin is unknown, stepping stones, along with log bridges, are likely to have been among the earliest means of crossing inland bodies of water devised by humans.

In traditional Japanese gardens, the term iso-watari refers to stepping stone pathways that lead across shallow parts of a pond, which work like a bridge-like slower crossing. Using iso-watari for crossing ponds, or shallow parts of streams, one can view the aquatic animals and plants around or in the pond, like carp, turtles, and waterfowl.

Today, stepping stones are commonly used by mountaineers and hikers as a makeshift way of crossing uncharted or unanticipated streams and torrents. They may occur alongside a ford.

== Historic stepping stones ==
The Drukken Steps in the Eglinton Woods of North Ayrshire in Scotland were a favourite haunt of poet Robert Burns and his companion Richard Brown, while the two were living in Irvine from 1781 to 1782.

The name "Drukken" steps derives from a person's gait as they stepped from stone to stone whilst crossing the Red Burn. Seven or more stones were originally set in the Red Burn which was much wider than in 2009.

Burns himself used the Scots spelling "Drucken" rather than "Drukken". The ruins of the Drukken Steps are in the Eglinton Country Park.

Historic stepping stones

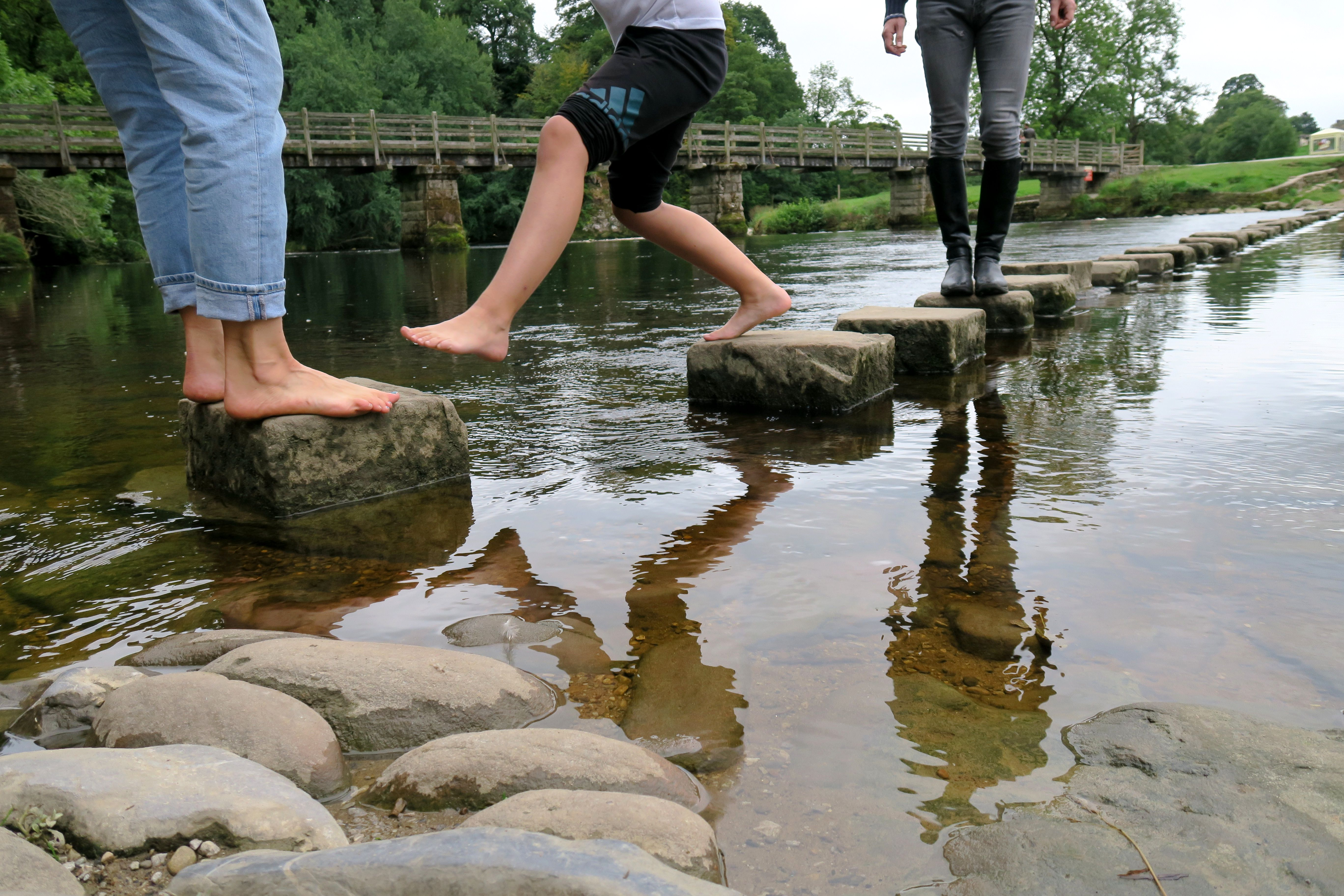
Stepping stones in Bolton Abbey

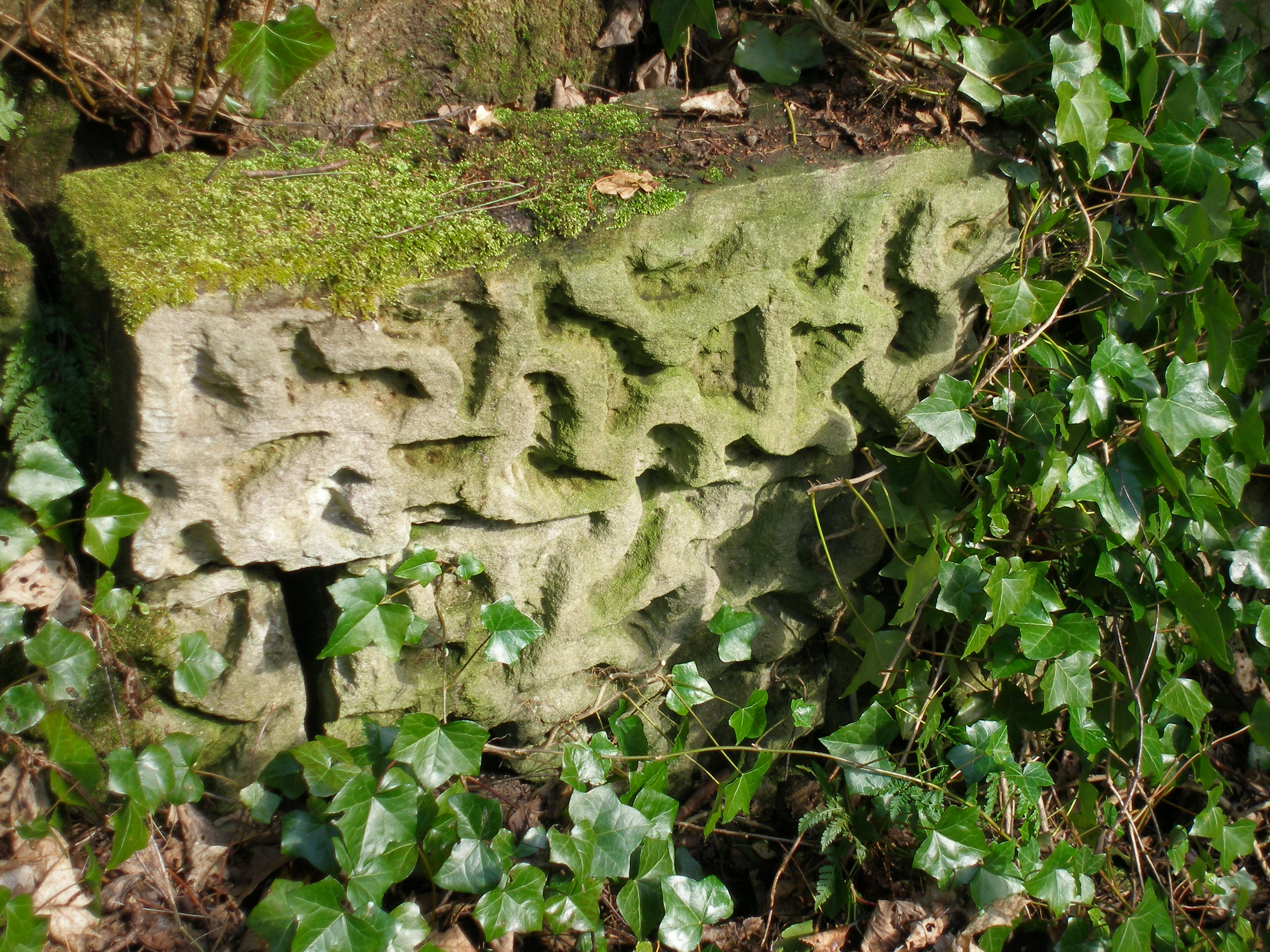
A stucco stone from The Drukken Steps, stepping stones in Scotland

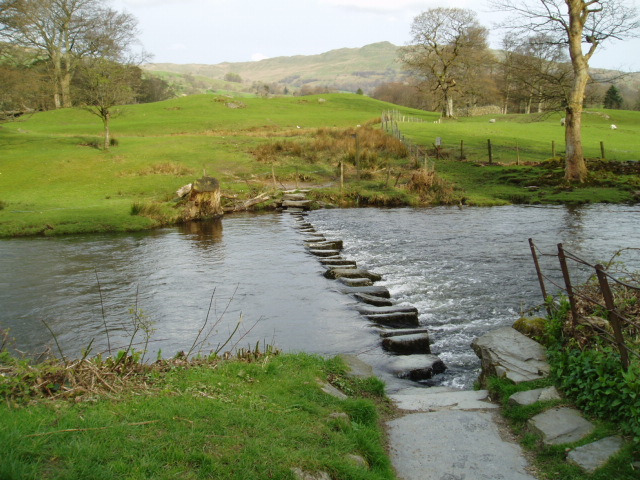
The stepping stones in the Rothay, Lake District, England

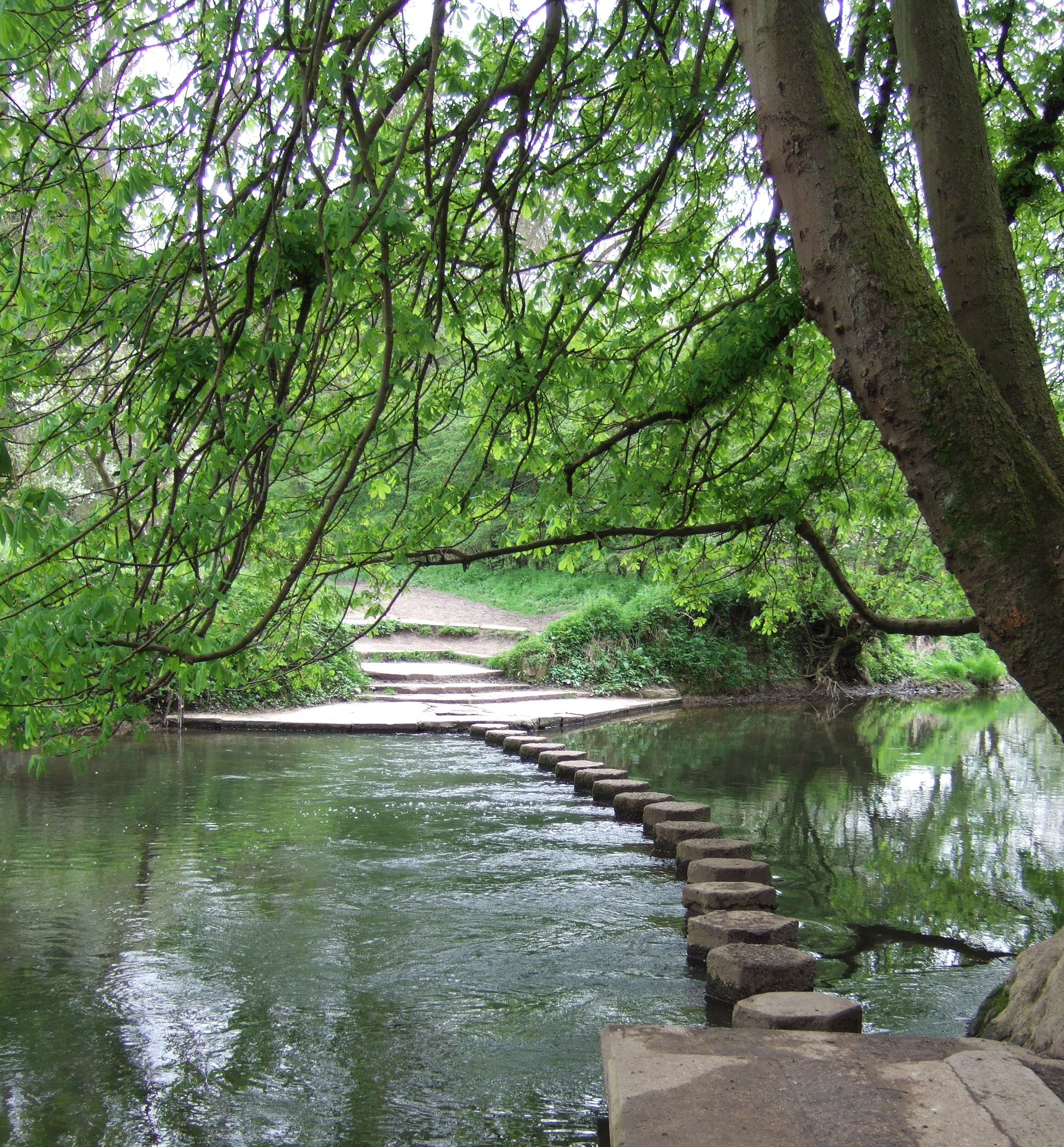
The stepping stones across the Mole at the foot of Box Hill, Surrey, England

== In popular culture ==
A deadly version of stepping stones involving glass tiles is featured in the 2021 South Korean series Squid Game as the fifth game played in the series.

== See also ==
- Clapper bridge – Bridge formed by large flat slabs of stone
- Footbridge – Bridge designed solely for pedestrians
- Ford (crossing) – Shallow place with good footing where a river or stream may be crossed by wading
- Kūlgrinda – Manmade track across swamps, found in and around Lithuania
