= Stanecastle =

Tower in North Ayrshire, Scotland

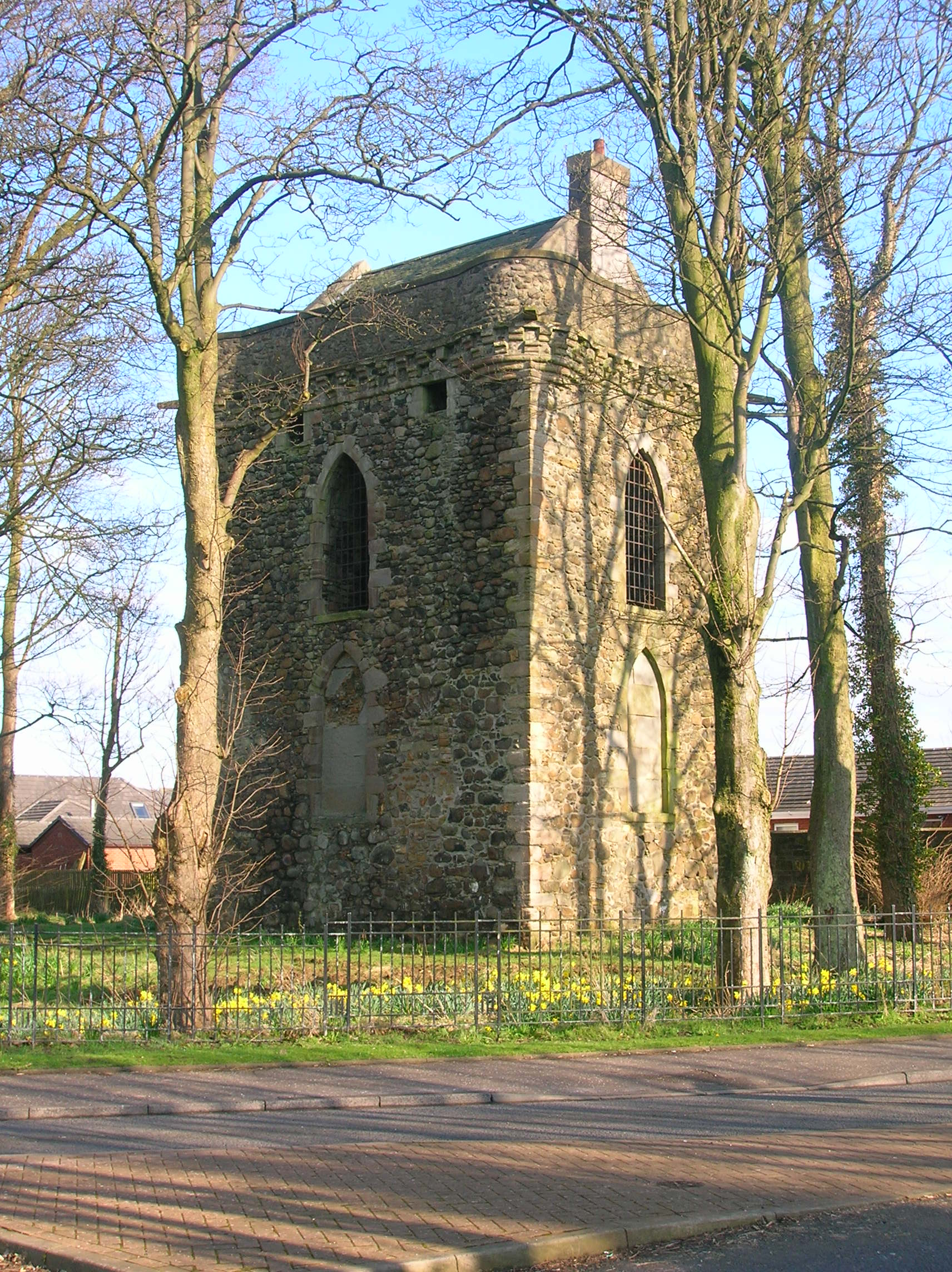
- Stanecastle in 2007
- Interactive map of the Stanecastle area

General information
- Type: Tower
- Location: Stanecastle, Irvine
- Coordinates: 55.6249°N 4.6418°W
- Construction started: ca.1363
- Renovated: ca.1750
- Owner: North Ayrshire Council

Stanecastle was a medieval barony and estate in North Ayrshire, Scotland, first mentioned in 1363 and now part of the Irvine New Town project. Its nearest neighbours are Bourtreehill and Girdle Toll.

== Roman origins? ==
The early history of Stanecastle is obscure but it was once believed that the "stane" (stone, Norse: steinn) prefix referred to older Roman structures. However, it is now known that stone building in Scotland and Ayrshire was not restricted to the Roman and Norman periods, and need not suggest any such Roman origins.

== Medieval life ==
The ancient name of the barony was the "Barony of Stane (Stone)". A ley tunnel is said to run from Seagate Castle in Irvine to Stane Castle.

=== Saint Bridget ===
William Fraunces de le Stane held lands which included a chapel dedicated to Saint Bridget. The chapel stood on the muir near to Stane on the right bank of the Annick Water.

At the core of the medieval estate may have been an older medieval nunnery or convent and evidence has been discovered (and long lost under a turnpike road) of a small medieval chapel, probably dedicated to St. Bridget and, as was the norm, had its own graveyard (also long buried underneath the road). In the 17th century the twenty shilling lands of old extent called Brydskirk are recorded, but with no mention of a chapel.

=== Stane castle ===
The original castle was built circa 1417 by the Francis family, who also held land at Sprouston near Kelso. The barony passed by marriage to the Montgomerys of Greenfield.

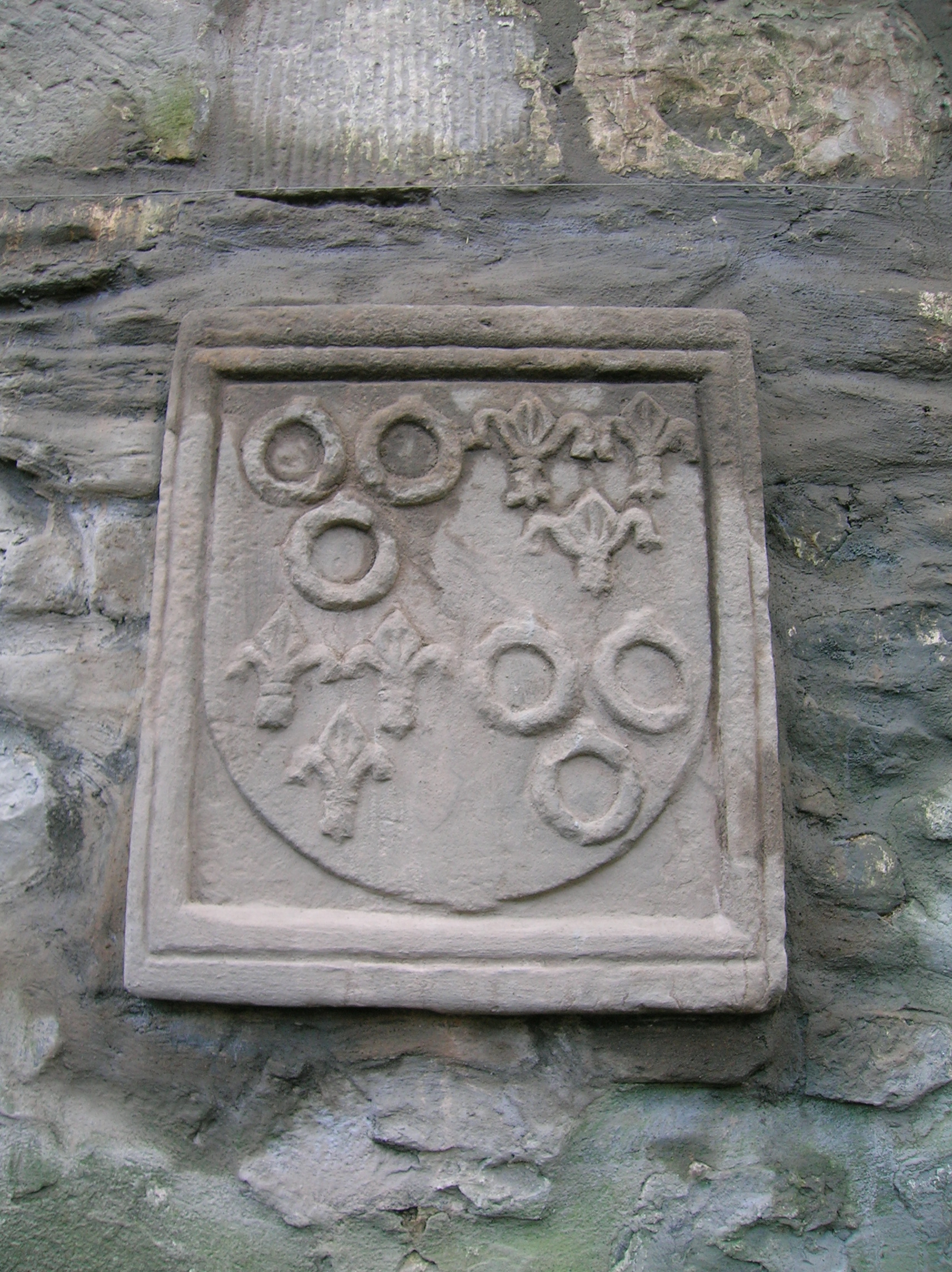
Coat of arms of the Montgomeries at Eglinton. The 'rings' represent the Eglinton family. The quarters are misplaced.

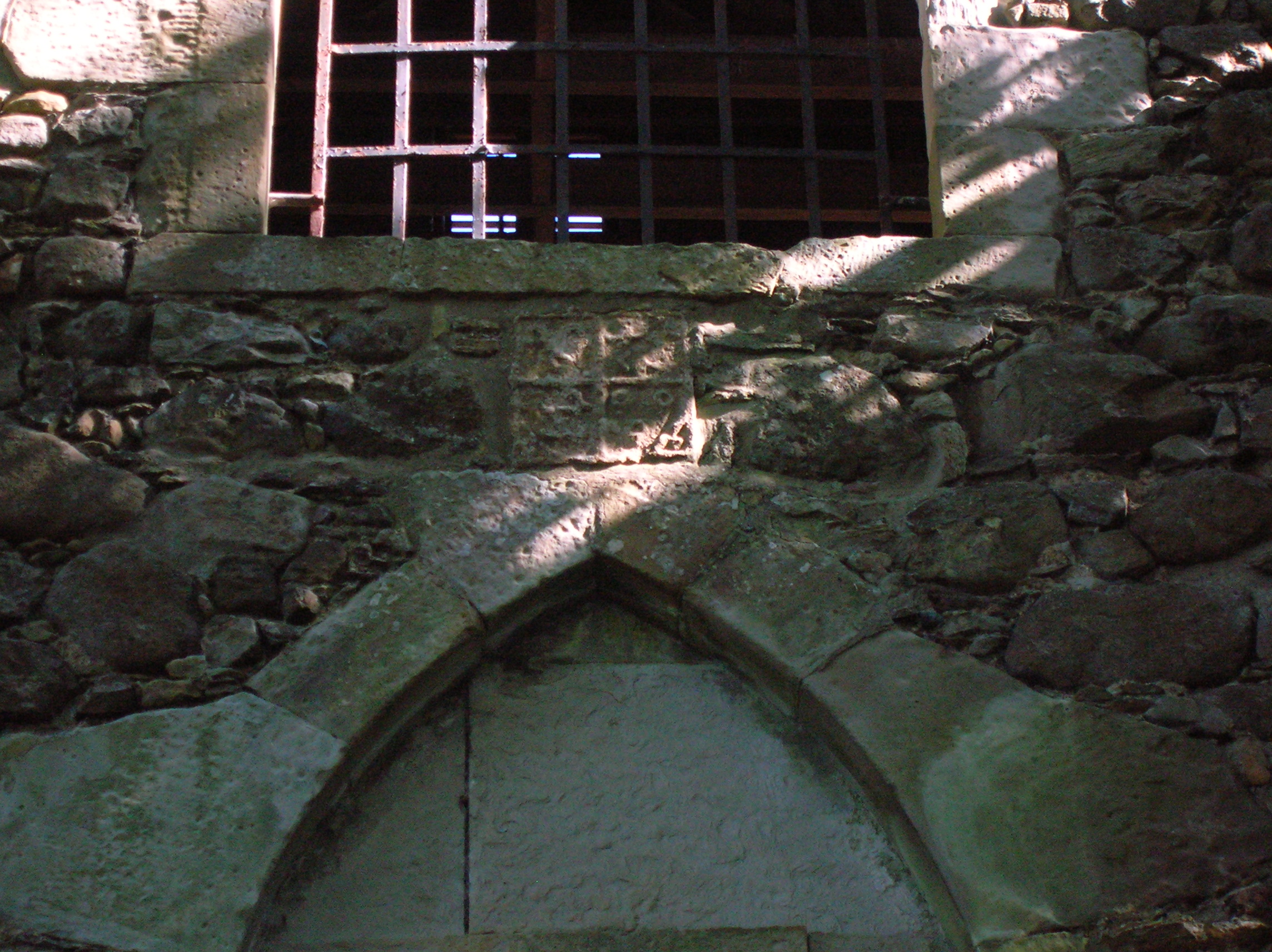
The Stanecastle armorial panel

In the middle-ages, Stanecastle gave way to the ever-expanding Eglinton Empire and William Francis of Stane passed his estate on to the Earls of Eglinton in the 15th century. Campbell states that the present castle was built in 1520 by Montgomerie of Greenfield, a cadet branch.

In 1750 Alexander, 10th Earl of Eglinton, repaired the castle, converting it into a folly. The four open and four closed pointed windows were constructed for appearance only at this time and on the west side an armorial panel stone with the Earl of Eglinton's arms was put in place. Through some mistake this panel was said to have been placed upside down; however, the shield is actually the right way up. The apparent fault is that the signet rings and fleur de lis inside are upside down. Another error occurs on a similar-sized armorial panel now preserved in the quadrangle of Eglinton Country Park in which the symbols are in the wrong quarters. An original feature is a spiral stair in the north-east corner.

The Ayr Roads Act 1774 (14 Geo. 3. c. 109) gives details of The Road from the Cockpitt near Stone-Castle by Armsheugh, .... Showing that, not unusually, a Cock Pit existed here at one time.

A Ley tunnel is said to run from Stanecastle to Eglinton Castle and Seagate in Irvine. Another tunnel is said to run from Stanecastle to Dundonald. A subterranean passage was found by workmen at Stanecastle in the 19th century.

Knadgerhill was only acquired by the Earls of Eglinton in 1851 when they excambied part of the lands of Bogside Flats for them. This allowed the construction of the new entrance to the policies at Stanecastle via Long Drive.

== Robert Burns ==
During 1781–1782 Robert Burns lived in Irvine and it is recorded that his favourite walk was through the Eglinton Woods. References to his passing Saint Bride's Well suggest that he may have passed through Stanecastle on his return journey, having walked along the old Toll Road, over the Drukken Steps at the Red burn and back to Irvine via Millburn, Sourlie, Girdle Gate and Stanecastle.

== 19th century ==
Stanecastle has been the subject of a few sentences from John Galt (born 1779), a native of Irvine, in his Ringan Gilhaize (1823) novel.

== Stanecastle today ==
Visible today is the superb keep of the original estate, into whose wall is set an inscribed stone. This keep was altered with the addition of eight mock-Gothic arched windows in the 18th century, and has a modern roof with chimney and windows. Irvine Development Corporation stabilised and carried out repairs on the structure. The Montgomery Society of Scotland had attempted to purchase it as a clan headquarters and museum, but the plans came to nothing.

Opposite the keep is the Stanecastle gate, a considerably younger structure but inkeeping with the overall design of the area. In the 20th century, this gateway, or rather its orientation, was altered. It once marked the southern entrance to the huge Eglinton Castle estate, now the Eglinton Country Park.

The remaining section of the estate has been fenced off and protected. For many years, the modern gate was padlocked and this has given way to a more open policy.

A record exists for the rare Rusty-Back Fern growing on the walls of the castle in the early 1900s. A search in 2002 did not locate the fern.

== Gallery ==
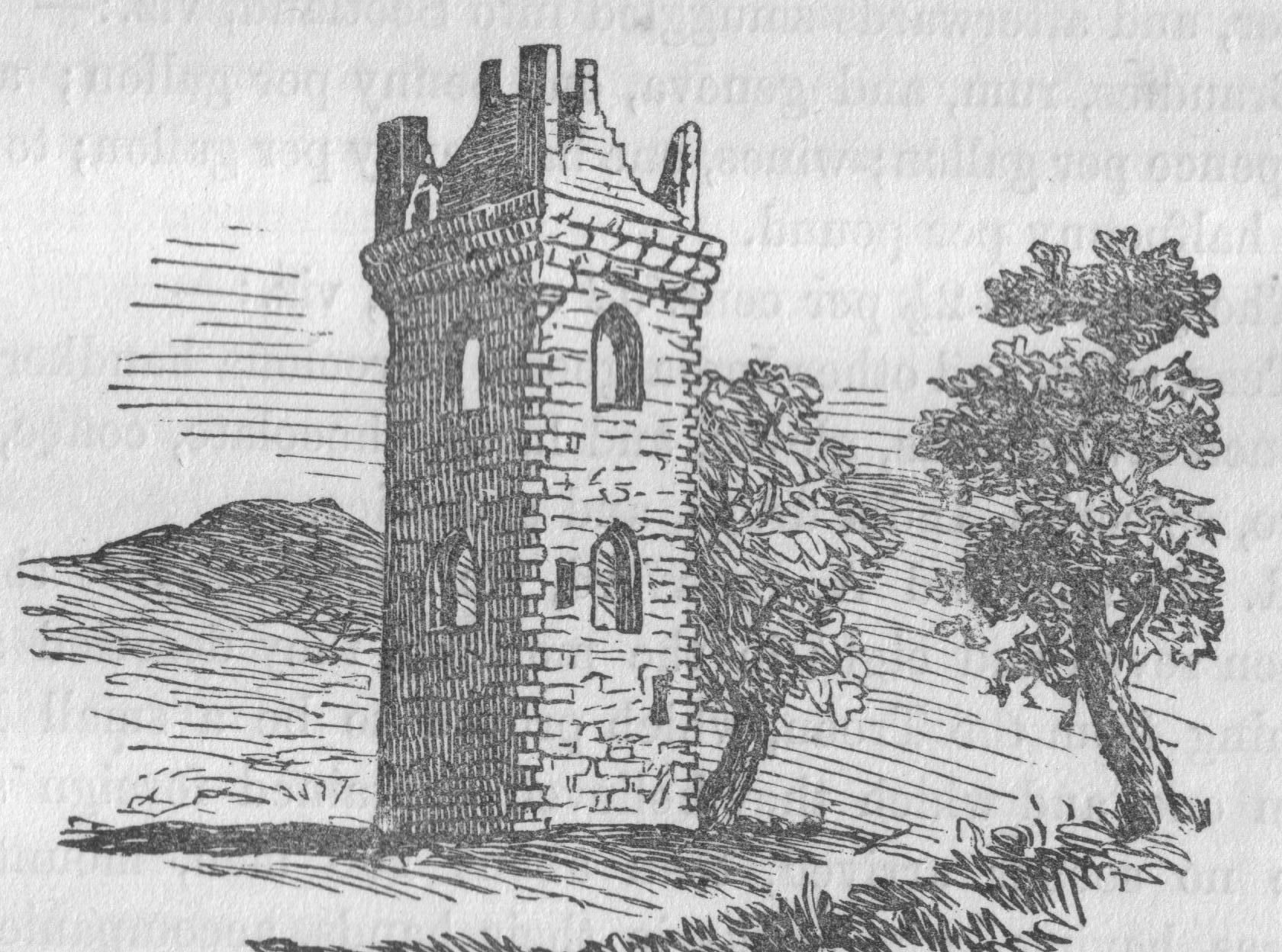
Stanecastle in 1866

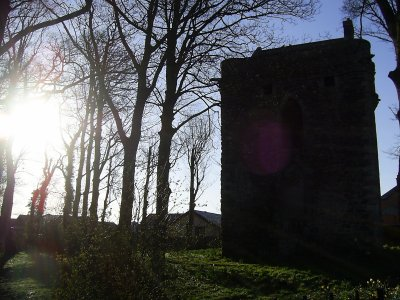
Stanecastle

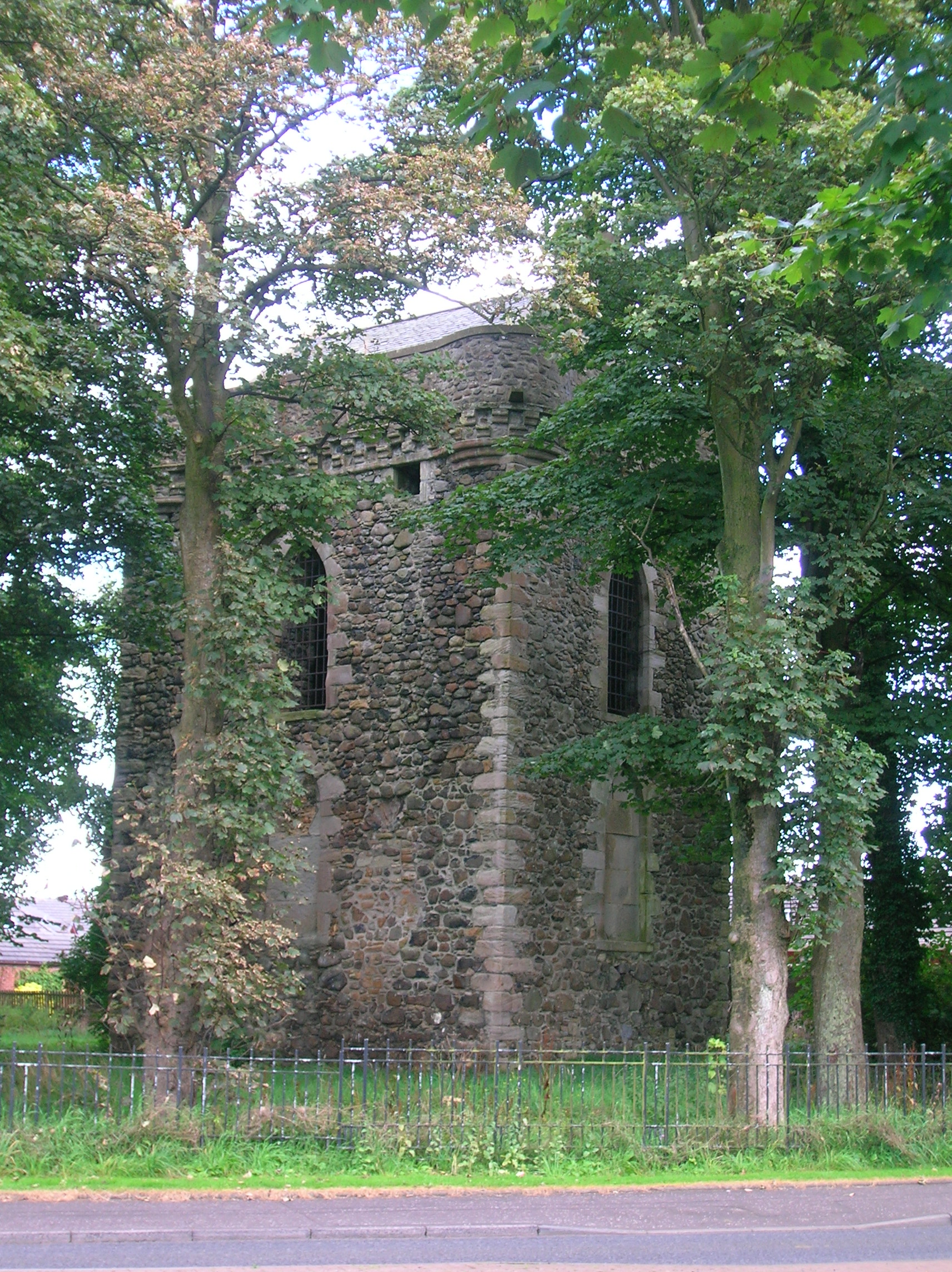
Stanecastle castle in summer

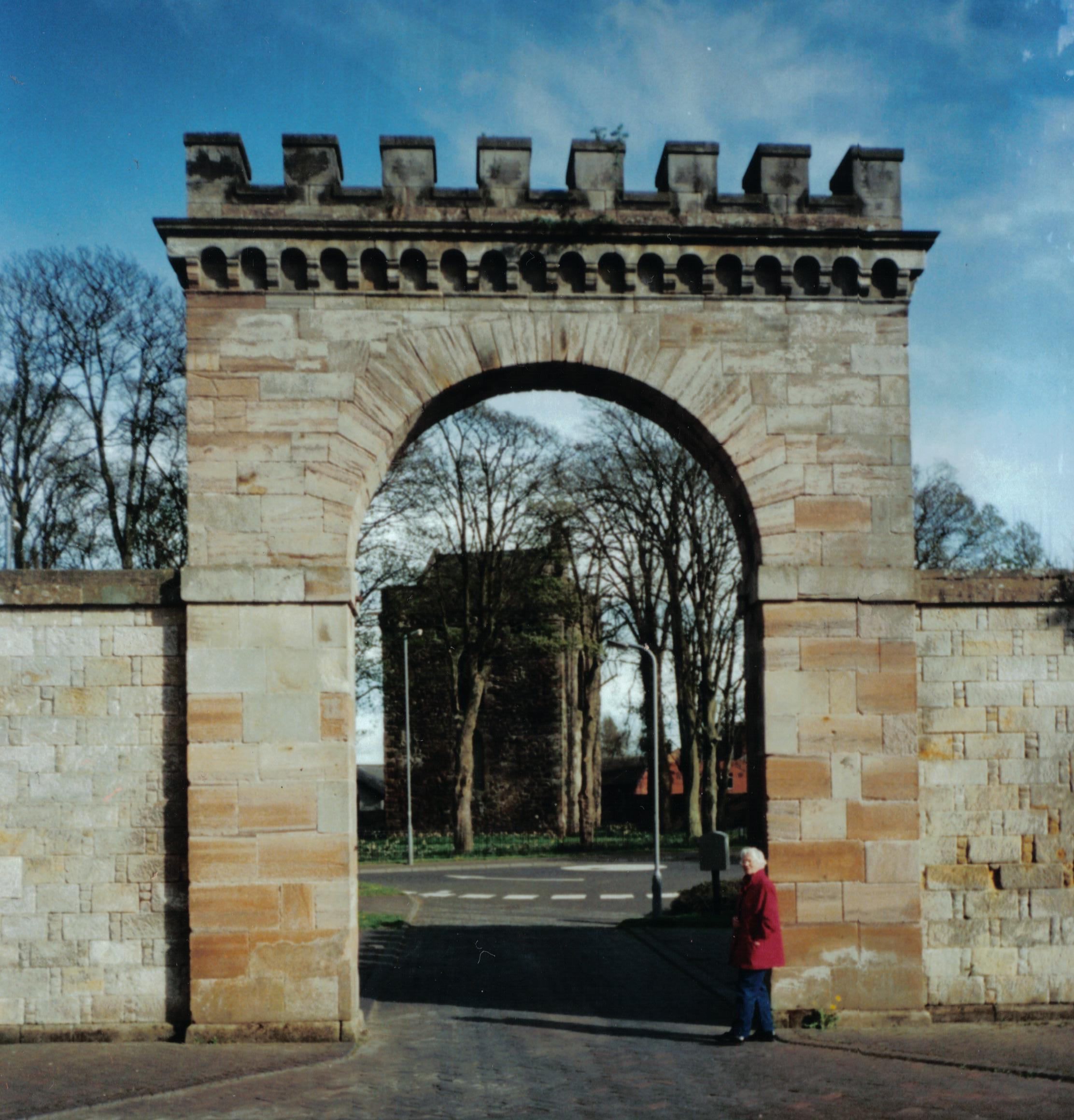
Stanecastle from the old Stanecastle Lodges

== See also ==
- Littlestane Loch
