= Dreghorn railway station =

Former railway station in Ayrshire

Dreghorn
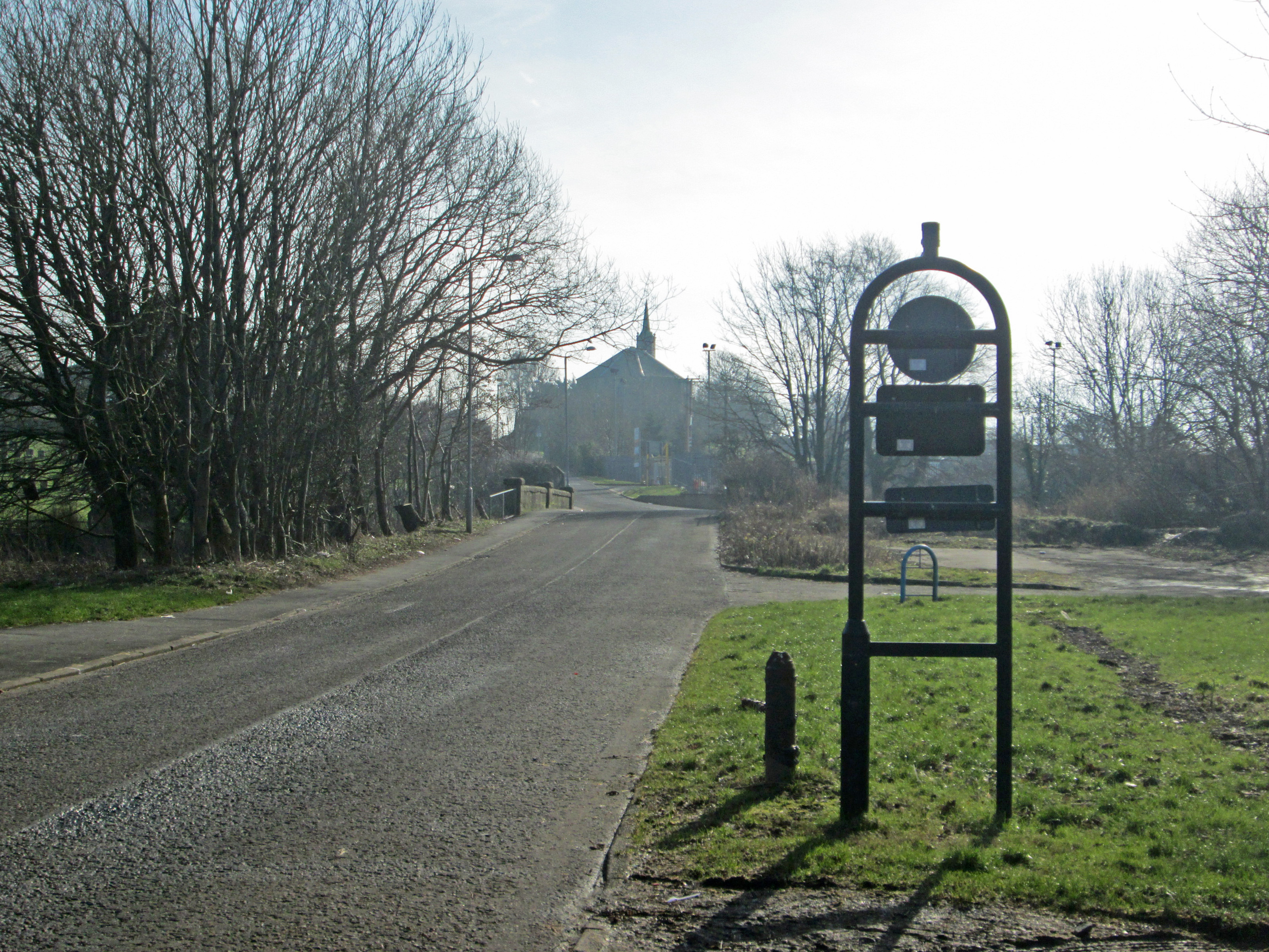
- Sign on NCR73 marking the station site, where Station Brae leads over the Annick Water to Dreghorn Parish Church

General information
- Location: Dreghorn, Ayrshire; Scotland
- Coordinates: 55.6119°N 4.6196°W
- Grid reference: NS350384
- Platforms: 2

Other information
- Status: Disused

History
- Original company: Glasgow, Paisley, Kilmarnock and Ayr Railway
- Pre-grouping: Glasgow and South Western Railway
- Post-grouping: London, Midland and Scottish Railway

Key dates
- 28 May 1848: Opened
- October 1850: Closed
- May 1868: Reopened
- 6 April 1964: Closed permanently
Location

Dreghorn railway station was a railway station serving the village of Dreghorn, North Ayrshire, Scotland. The station was originally part of the Glasgow, Paisley, Kilmarnock and Ayr Railway. The line forms part of National Cycle Route 73, and the site of the station is marked by signs at the junction with Station Brae, Dreghorn.

== History ==
The station opened on 28 May 1848, and closed in October 1850. The station reopened in May 1868, and closed permanently to passengers on 6 April 1964, although the line between Irvine and Crosshouse was still in use by trains until October 1965.

== Gallery ==
Near Perceton Junction, outside Dreghorn. Bourtreehill Brickworks sidings and wagons on the left.

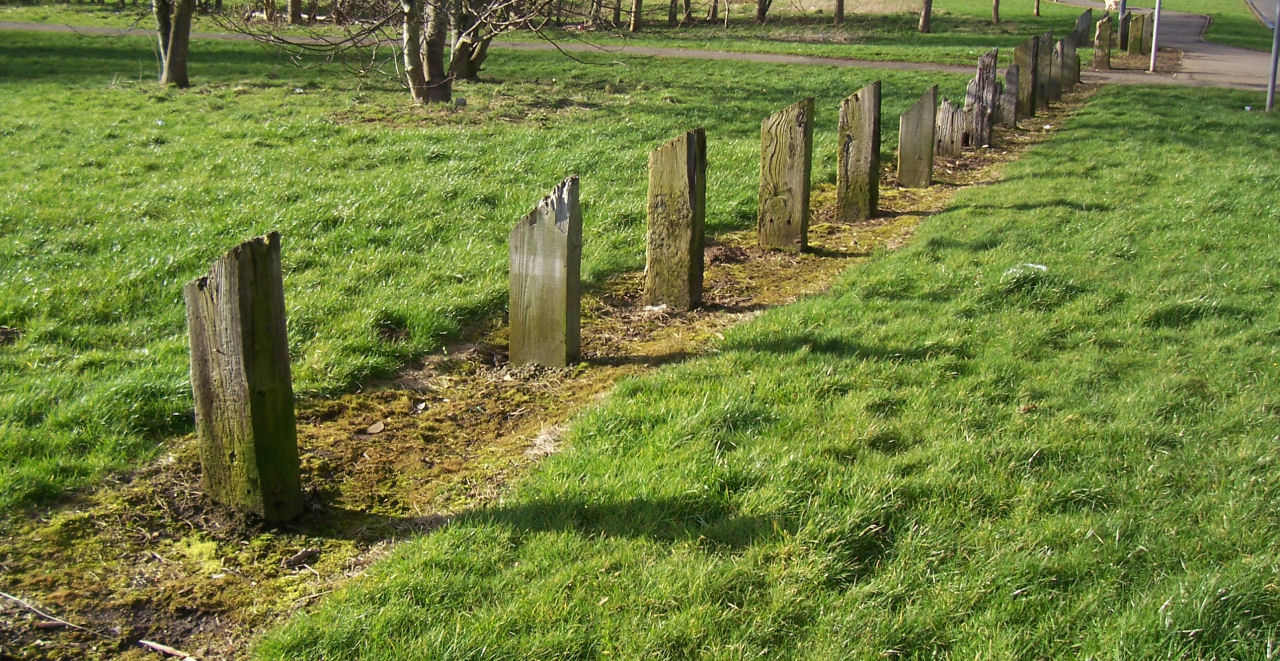
A row of sleepers near the site of the station in 2007.

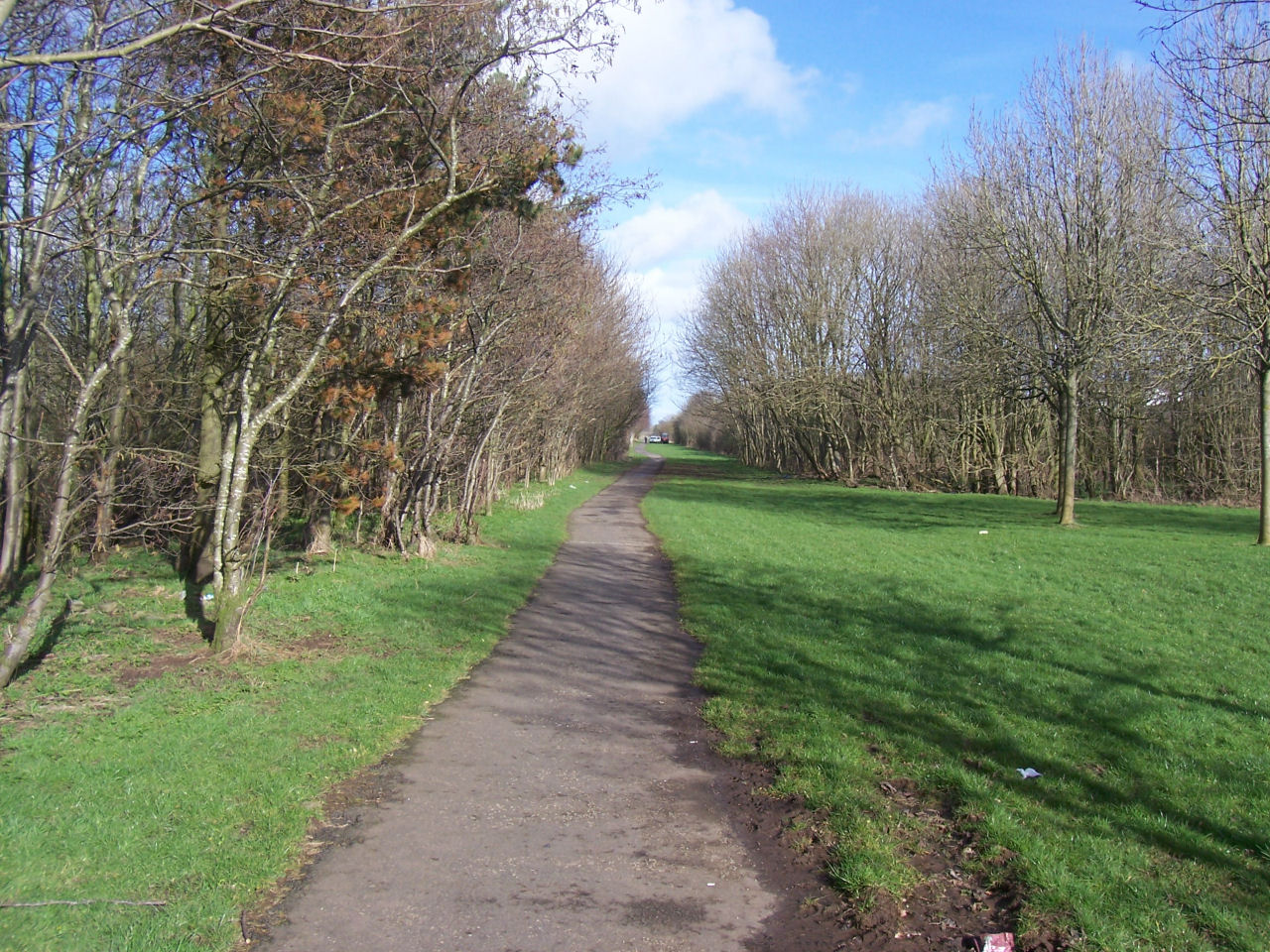
The site of Dreghorn Station in 2007

Preceding station	Historical railways	Following station
Springside; Line and station closed	Glasgow and South Western Railway; Glasgow, Paisley, Kilmarnock and Ayr Railway	Irvine; Line closed, station open
