= Dreghorn =

Coordinates: 55°36′26″N 4°37′01″W

- Village
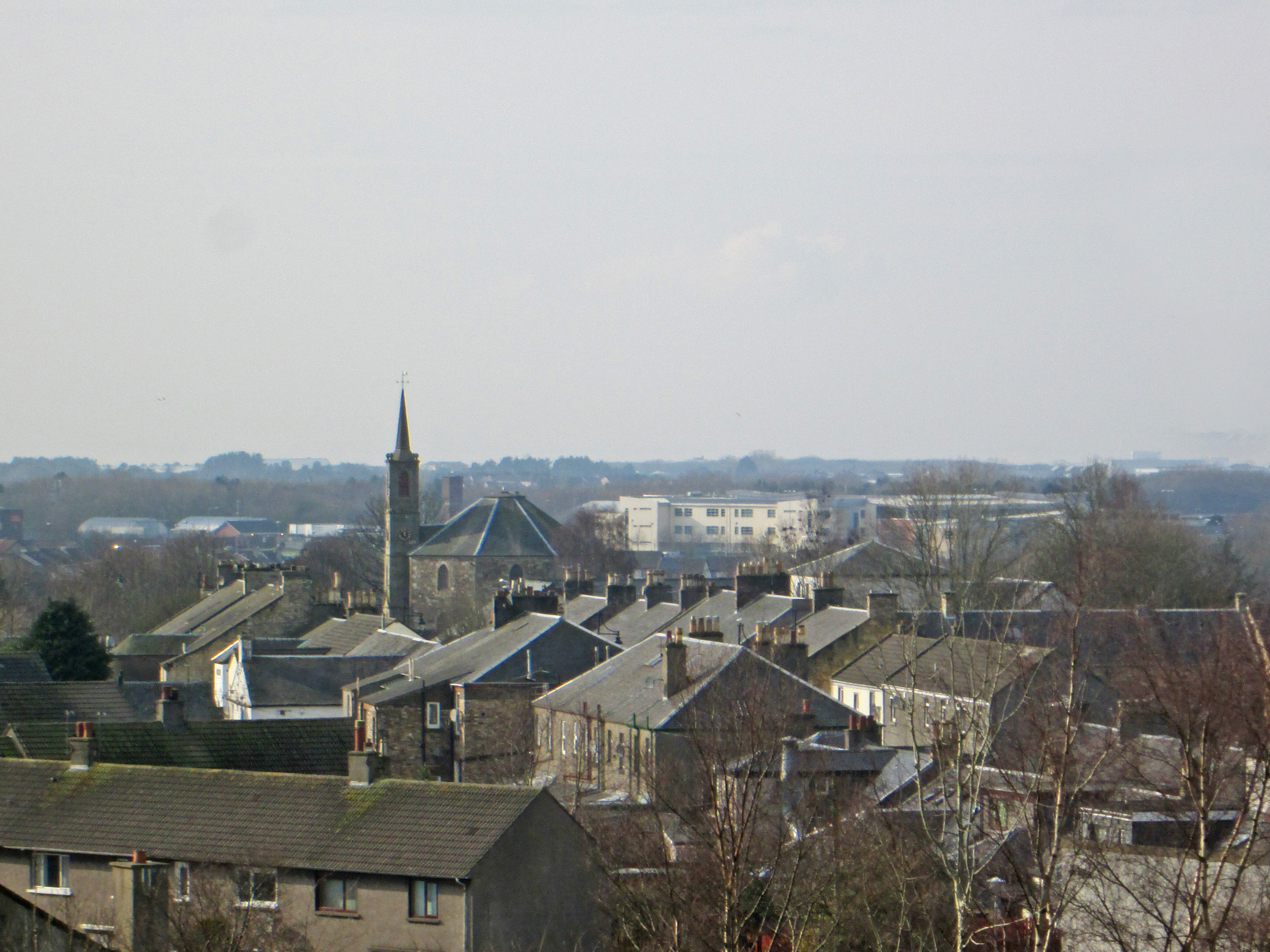
- Dreghorn Main Street, from the war memorial

- Location within North Ayrshire
- Population: 3,450 (2020)
- Council area: North Ayrshire
- Lieutenancy area: Ayrshire and Arran
- Country: Scotland
- Sovereign state: United Kingdom
- Post town: IRVINE
- Postcode district: KA11
- Dialling code: 01294
- Police: Scotland
- Fire: Scottish
- Ambulance: Scottish
- UK Parliament: Central Ayrshire
- Scottish Parliament: Cunninghame South

Dreghorn is a village in North Ayrshire, Scotland, 3.5 kilometres (2 1/4 miles) east of Irvine town centre, on the old main road from Irvine to Kilmarnock. It is sited on a ridge between two rivers. As archaeological excavations near the village centre have found a significant neolithic settlement provisionally dated to around 3500 BC, as well as medieval structures, scholars have suggested that Dreghorn could be Britain's oldest continuously inhabited village. Both Irvine and Dreghorn have grown in size and they are now separated by the Annick Valley Park, which incorporates a footpath and National Cycle Route 73 on the route of the disused Irvine to Busby railway line. It had an estimated population of 3,450 in 2020.

The Church of Scotland Dreghorn and Springside Parish Church, at the centre of the village, dates from 1780. Its octagonal plan, which is unusual in Scotland, was produced by the church's principal benefactor, Archibald Montgomerie, 11th Earl of Eglinton. The village's most famous inhabitant, John Boyd Dunlop, was born at a Dreghorn farm in 1840. When practicing as a veterinary surgeon in Belfast, in 1887 he invented pneumatic tyres for bicycles.

== History ==
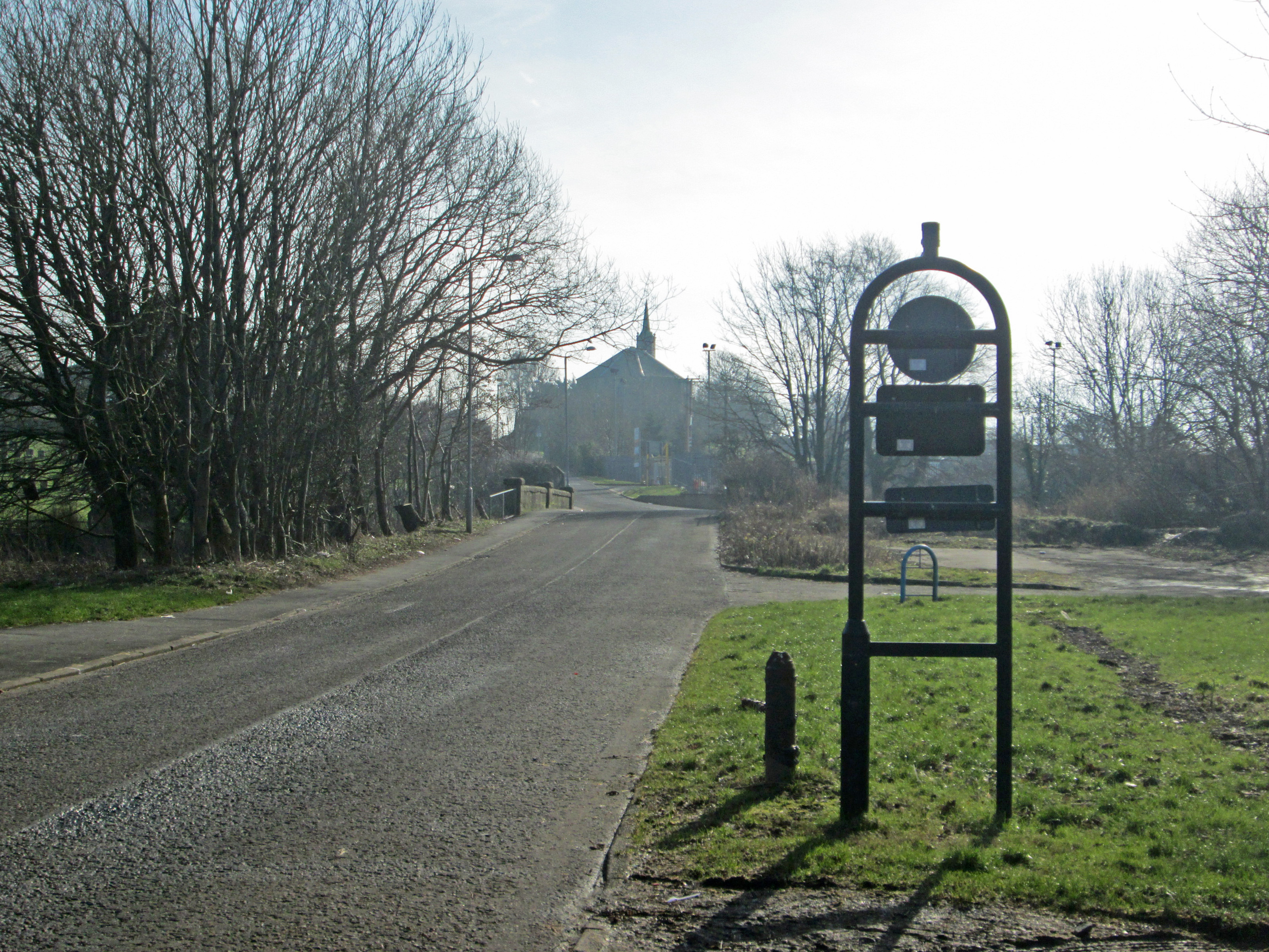
View south up Station Brae over Dreghorn Bridge across the Annick Water to the Parish Church, with NCR73 sign at the site of the station.

Dreghorn was the site of a significant neolithic settlement, and subsequently a medieval village: archaeological evidence has been provisionally dated to around 3500 BC, suggesting that Dreghorn could be Britain's oldest continuously inhabited village. In advance of a development of new housing to the north of properties on the current Main Street, preliminary testing found features including an ancient well.

The excavations were carried out between November 2003 and April 2004 at a site on the slope from the ridge down towards Annick Water. The housing development has since been completed, as Station Brae Gardens. Neolithic features included pits and post holes with remains including fragments of some Early Neolithic carinated bowls and larger amounts of Late Neolithic Grooved ware. Stone items were made from local and imported materials including flint, Arran pitchstone and chert, and included scrapers, arrowheads and cutting tools.

Three parallel rows of post holes indicated a rectangular structure measuring 23.5 by 5 metres (77 by 16 feet), probably a timber hall similar to the Neolithic long house found at Balbridie. Smaller post holes and stake holes define eight to twelve round or oval structures, possibly round houses, as well as six gully-defined structures with numerous stake-holes. A large oval feature, measuring approximately 1.8 by 1.2 m (5 ft 11 in by 3 ft 11 in), contained heavily retired pottery shards and is thought likely to have been a kiln. Possible ritualistic landscape features include a massive post-pit and post holes or pits forming arcs. At the west edge of the site, adjacent to Station Brae, part of a probable palisade was found. Medieval finds included a trackway, ditches, pits and remains of numerous structures including kilns and a 4-metre-diameter (13 ft) wattle and daub walled granary.

John Boyd Dunlop was born at a Dreghorn farm on 5 February 1840. He qualified as a veterinary surgeon at the Dick Vet in Edinburgh and set up practice in Belfast, where he also invented a pneumatic tyres for bicycles in October 1887. The principle had been patented by Robert William Thomson in 1847, but it was Dunlop's invention that made a success of the idea.

=== Maid Morville's mound ===
Maid Morville's mound was located to the east of the B730, just north of Holmsford Bridge before it crosses the River Irvine. The name commemorated the tragic drowning of a member of the de Morville family, who were the overlords of the baillerie of Cunninghame. The mound was destroyed by construction of the earthworks of the expressway. "Maid Morville Avenue" still exists to commemorate the event. Locally the mound was known as "Marble Hill", a corruption of "Morville's Hill". There is also a "Marble Avenue" nearby.

=== Railway Station ===
Dreghorn Station, at the foot of Station Brae by the River Annick, provided access to rail services between Irvine and Kilmarnock. It closed in 1964 and the railway is now a public footpath and woodland.

== Geography and demographics ==
=== Locale ===
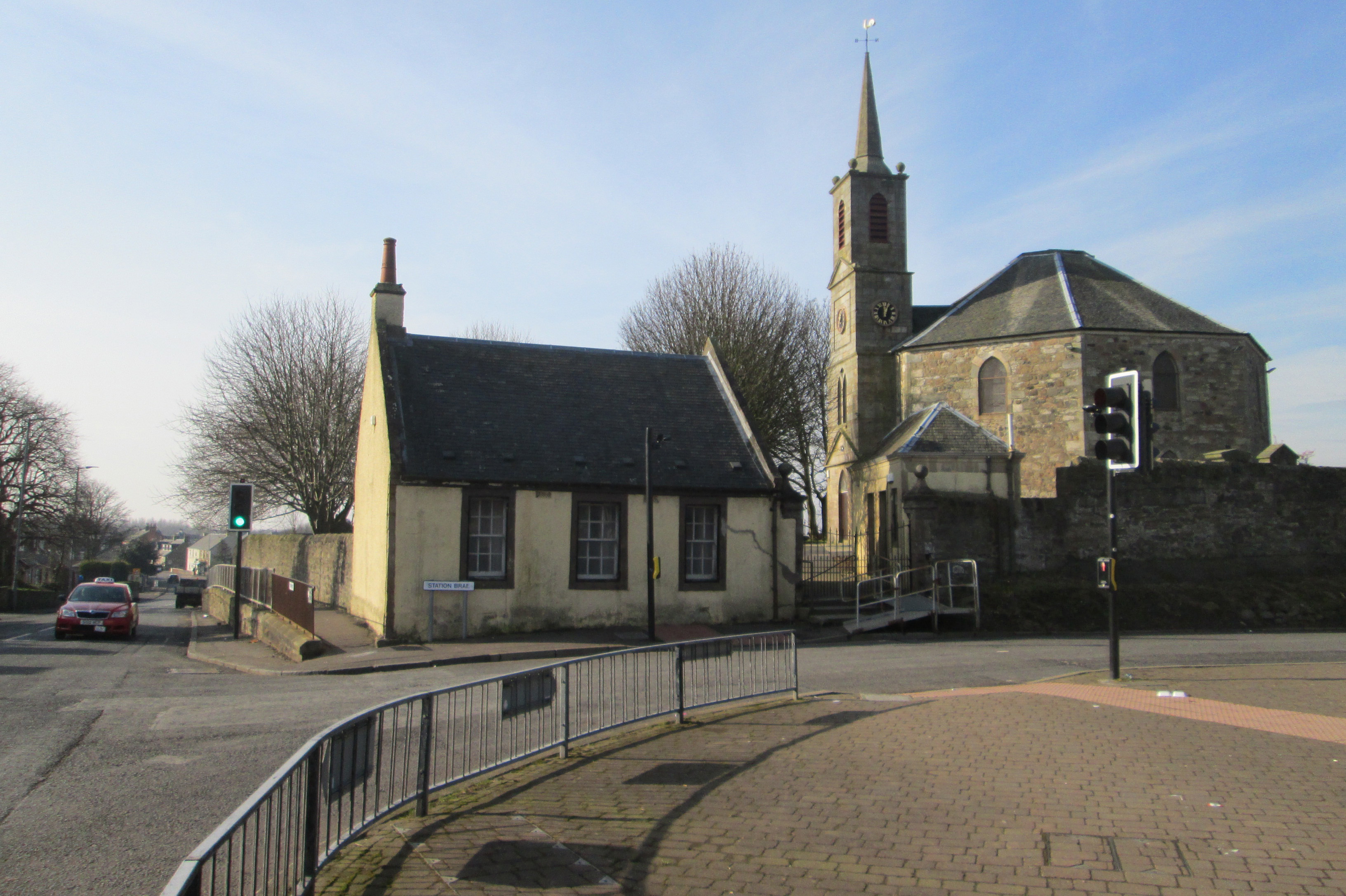
Townfoot (B7081) crossroads, old Post office and Parish Church

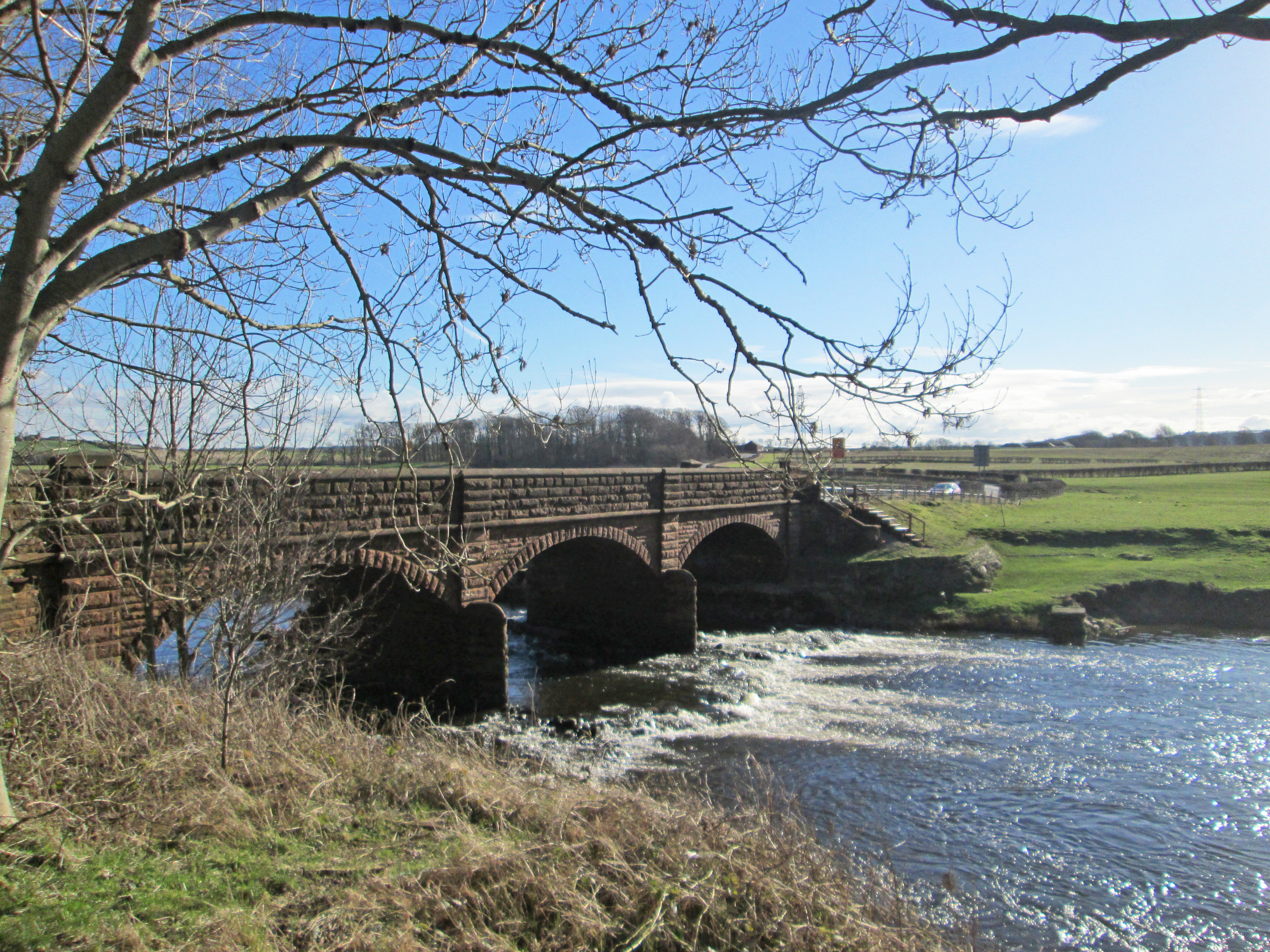
Holmsford Bridge which replaced a fording point of the River Irvine, looking south along the B730 towards Drybridge.

Dreghorn lies on a ridge between Annick Water, to its immediate north, and the River Irvine further south. The old main road from Irvine to Kilmarnock (now the B7081) formed the original village street along the ridge. As Townfoot, it rises to the high point of the ridge at the Parish Church in the centre of the village, then continues as Main Street east along the ridge, down to the nearby village of Springside which is also in Dreghorn Parish.

The Annick Water runs close to the north of the village, along the edge of the Annick Valley Park. Woodland and open green spaces, including playing fields, separate Dreghorn from Irvine New Town, with the district of Broomlands adjoining the park. The disused Irvine to Busby railway line, which runs along this park, has been converted to a footpath, and forms National Cycle Route 73 as part of the Irvine New Town Trail.

At a crossroads immediately to the east of the church, Station Brae runs north down the hill to the former Dreghorn railway station, and the B730 runs south towards Drybridge, crossing the River Irvine at Holmsford Bridge. Here it crosses under the A71 road, which runs as a modern bypass along the Irvine Valley to the south of the village. A link from the B730 joins the A71 at a roundabout at Corsehill, providing expressway access from Dreghorn to Irvine town centre, and eastwards to Kilmarnock.

=== Religion ===
Excavations of the Neolithic site suggest ritualistic features, and early Christians including the Culdees often took over pagan religious sites for their churches. Saint Brendan influenced the area in the 6th century. It seems that relics of his fellow monk Barrintus were venerated at Dreghorn church, though this could date from a much later period. When Kilwinning Abbey was established around 1171, fourteen parishes including Dreghorn came under its control. One of the monks would have been given charge of Dreghorn parish and the church lands.

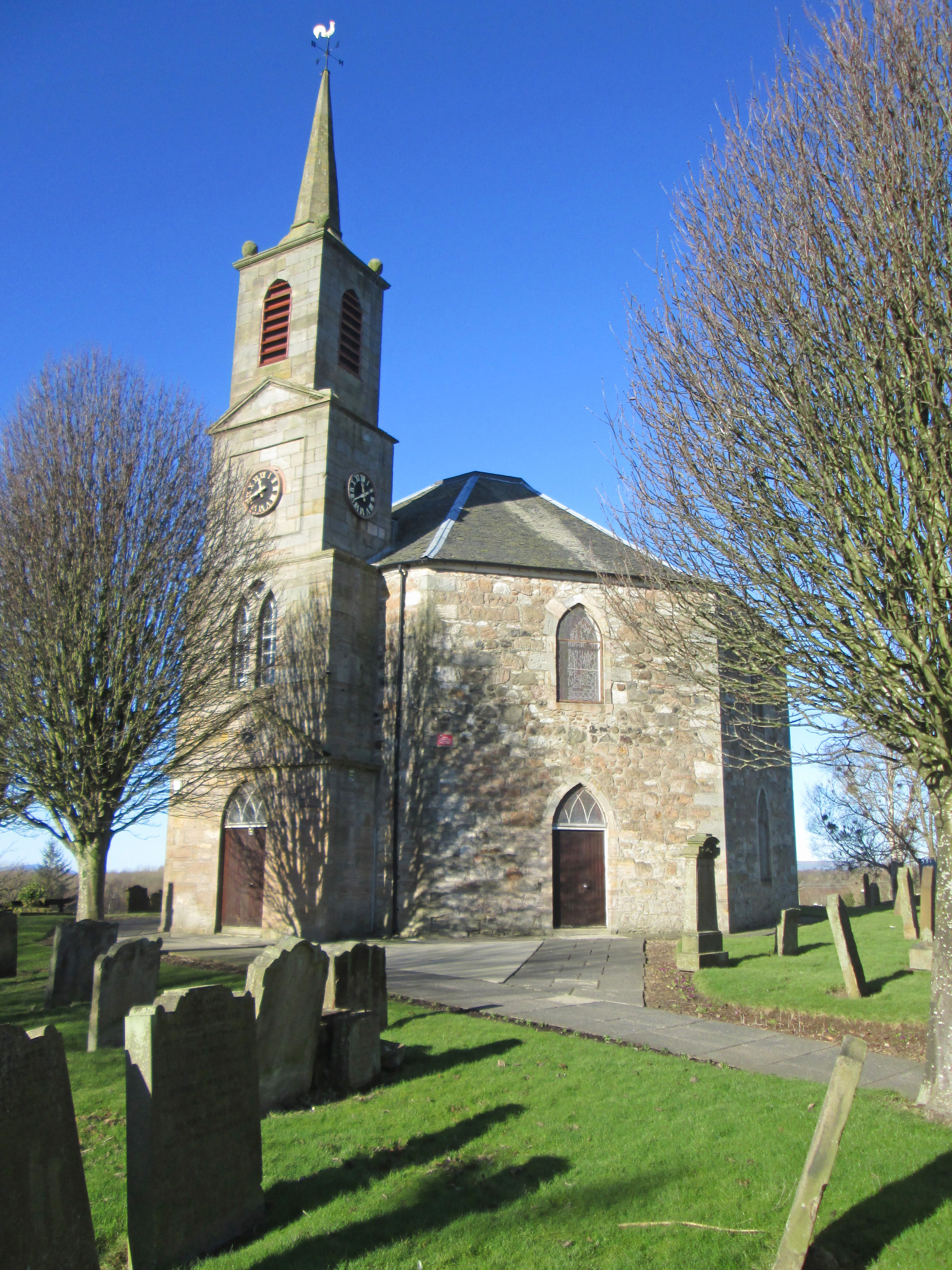
The unusual octagonal Kirk of Dreghorn

The Church of Scotland parish church at the top of Station Brae, dating from 1780, has an unusual octagonal plan. At one time, the church was known locally as the "Threepenny" after the 12-sided Threepence coin.

Following the Scottish Reformation, maintenance of the small rectangular church, the manse and churchyard, as well as payment of the minister's stipend, was vested in local landowners, the Heritors of the Parish. After years of complaints over repairs, in February 1777 the minister, Mr Tod. petitioned the Presbytery in Irvine that "a visitation be made with assistance of skilled tradesmen that the church (in Dreghorn) be pulled down and a new one built" on the same site. The Presbytery agreed in March 1777, then in 1779 they petitioned the principal Heritor, and patron of the church, Archibald Montgomerie, 11th Earl of Eglinton, to "give in a plan of a New Kirk". The heritors agreed in March 1780 to commence building work on the basis of his plan, in the shape of an octagon: he may have seen similar churches during his recent years spent in Europe.

Built as a school in 1774 the small building on the right of the entrance to the churchyard was in the 19th century used as a morthouse and a mortuary, with a room for each, later becoming the kirk session house. When the Parishes of Dreghorn and Perceton were united, Dreghorn and Perceton church owned the land surrounding the church (called 'The Glebe'). A current circular cul-de-sac called The Glebe commemorates this fact. The kirk is now called Dreghorn and Springside Parish Church.

In the Disruption of 1843, the Free Church of Scotland broke away. The entry for Dreghorn in Groome's Ordnance Gazetteer for 1882-4 describes the village as having "a Free Church mission station and an Evangelical Union chapel; and Dreghorn Free church is at Perceton village."

Perceton and Dreghorn Free Church, at the east end of Main Street in Dreghorn, was built in 1877 for £4,000. It later became the Church of Scotland's Perceton and Dreghorn Parish Church, but eventually congregation numbers fell, so the parishes merged and the church closed in 1992. A Threatened Building Survey recorded photographs of the building in 1996.

The Sun Life Corporation of Japan bought the building for £50,000. In 1996 they demolished it carefully and shipped the materials to Hiratsuka, Kanagawa, for reconstruction, at a cost of £250,000. This included the pulpit and church organ, and every block of masonry was numbered for rebuilding. The Hotel Sunlife Garden wedding complex, incorporating the reconstructed church as its central feature, was opened with a ceremony on 2 July 1999.

== Employment ==
Dreghorn's historical main industries were farming and coal mining. All of the coal mines around Dreghorn were closed by the early 1980s. Dreghorn is still surrounded on two sides by farm land. The new communities of Broomlands and Bourtreehill cover the sites of some former mines.

Dreghorn Primary School, on Main Street, had a school roll of 270 pupils in 2013, with 21 teachers. Greenwood Academy secondary school at the west end of the village serves several areas of Irvine as well as Dreghorn. In September 2013, its school roll was 1494 pupils, and it had 113 teachers.

== Notable people ==
- Nicola Sturgeon - SNP politician and former First Minister of Scotland (2014-2023)
- John Boyd Dunlop - Scottish inventor of the pneumatic tyre

== Other Dreghorns ==
A pastoral property named Dreghorn had been established in north Queensland, Australia, by 1864. Gold and silver was discovered there and mined in the 1860s and 1870s, the mining town taking the name of Dreghorn.
