= Springside, North Ayrshire =

Village in North Ayrshire, Scotland

Coordinates: 55°36′55″N 4°35′23″W

Springside
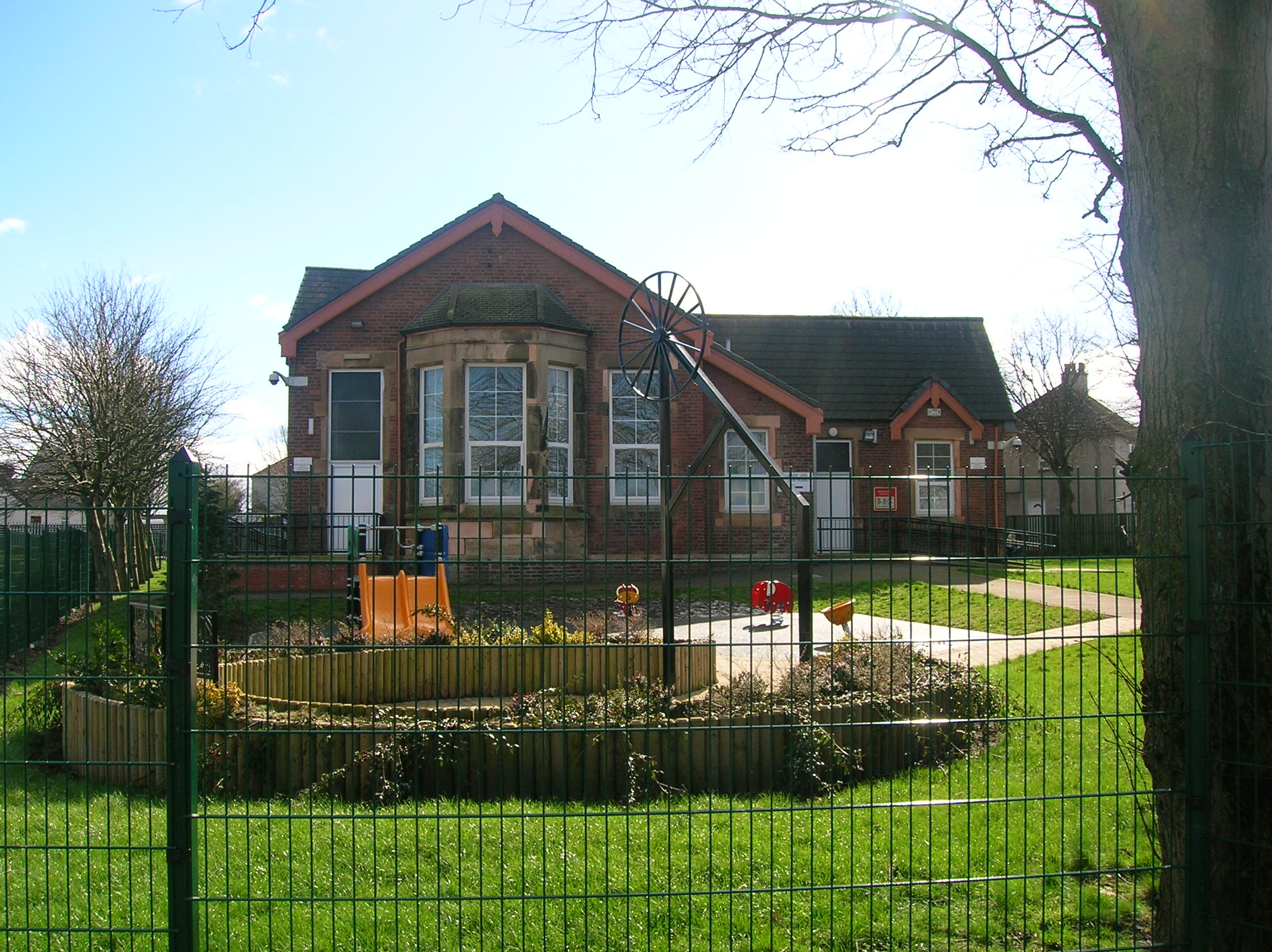
- The old Springhill Institute and library, now the Springside Community Centre

- Location within North Ayrshire
- Population: 1,190 (2020)
- Council area: North Ayrshire
- Country: Scotland
- Sovereign state: United Kingdom
- Police: Scotland
- Fire: Scottish
- Ambulance: Scottish

Springside is a village in the parish of Dreghorn, in the council area of North Ayrshire, Scotland. It is three miles (five kilometres) from Irvine, 1 1/2 miles (2.5 kilometres) west of Crosshouse, and four miles (six kilometres) from Kilmarnock. In the 18th, 19th and mid-20th centuries, the locality was a highly industrialised coal mining district. The settlement is on the Garrier Burn, which forms the boundary with East Ayrshire. Springside had a population of around 1364 in 1991. The A71 now bypasses the village, 1/4 mile (400 metres) to the south.

== Introduction ==
Springside (NS370386) lies on the old main road from Irvine to Kilmarnock, with a junction for Cunninghamhead and Stewarton district. A minor road branches off for Busbiehill and Knockentiber. A milestone stood near the small shop at the junction of the road leading up to the primary school.

== History ==
The entire parish of Dreghorn belonged in the 12th century to the De Morvilles, Lord High Constables of Scotland, from whom it passed in 1196 to Roland, Lord of Galloway. The name Kirkland is marked on Timothy Pont's map of 1604 and on Armstrong's map of 1775, showing its antiquity. 1775 map. The name implies church ownership, possibly through a feudal grant of land by a local baron in pre-reformation times.

Part of the reason for the development of Springside was to cater for travellers on the roads, with the Croft Inn being built by the Bankhead family from Northern Ireland in the 17th century to cater for the stagecoach routes from Kilmarnock to Irvine and Stewarton to Troon. This survives as Scott's Corner (2007). The Bankhead area of Springside is named after them, indeed Bankhead was the main name for the area until the Royal Mail reorganised its postal districts in the 1930s and at that point many hamlets and other localities ceased to exist officially, such as Springhill, Corsehill, and Kirklands. The eastern area of the present Springside was called Bankhead up until at least the 1921–1928 OS, the hamlet of Springside being originally clustered around Springside railway station with its Springside and Kirkland miners rows.

The earliest recording of the Bankhead surname is from 1527 in Riccarton parish, and there are many references to the family in Kilmaurs / Kilwinning / Irvine in the 16th and 17th centuries. The Bankends seem to have spread originally from Ayrshire to Northern Ireland in the 17th and 18th centuries, with some most likely returning in the 19th century. Documents in the National Archives showing the Springside "lands of Bankhead" date back at least as far as 1512. Bankhead is, of course, an exceedingly common Scottish placename in its purely descriptive context; however, it is a most uncommon surname.

Laigh Milton viaduct over the River Irvine is situated nearby. This is the oldest railway viaduct in Scotland and one of the oldest in the world.

The old schoolhouse still stands at the Overtoun end of the village, the new primary school being opened in 1979. In the last few years (2006–2007), much of the council housing on the main road near the Croft Inn has been demolished and private housing built. The tranquil rural surroundings of 2007 totally belie the industrial past of the area.

=== Thorntoun Estate ===
Springside was close to several country estates which provided employment and contributed to the need for the establishment of rural settlements such as Springside. Thorntoun house and estate, including Carmel Bank, previously another Cuninghame property lies just up the Thorntoun Brae towards Crosshouse. It was home to various families, such as the Montgomerys, Rosses, Mures, Cuninghames, Peebles, Wreys and Sturrocks, before becoming a school, opened by Barnardo's in September 1971 for children with emotional difficulties aged 11 to 16 years. The school closed in 1990 and Thorntoun finally became a nursing home. The house itself was demolished shortly after the Second World War and a new building constructed.

=== Warwickhill Estate ===
Warwickhill estate was situated towards the Overtoun Miners' Row. Farms with the name Warwickdale and Warwickhill are still extant, "Warrix" being the origin of this otherwise seemingly very English-sounding name.

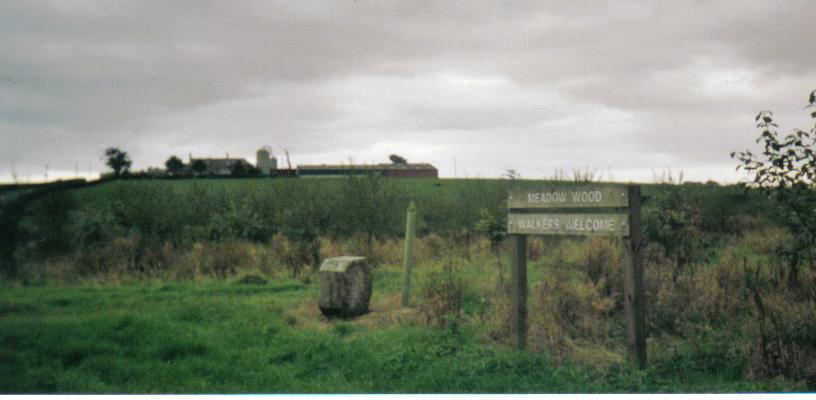
A view of the Meadow Wood and Warwickdale Farm in 2006

Warrix (now Warrick) Hill also formed part of the demesne of the De Morvilles who forfeited their lands to Robert the Bruce. Sir James, son of Sir James Stewart of Bonkill, son of Alexander the High Steward of Scotland, obtained Peirstoun (Perceton) and Warrixhill, and his son, also Sir James, in turn inherited. This son had only a daughter as heir and she married Sir William Douglas and thus the property passed by marriage to the Barclay's of Pierstoun. Warrixhill became divided into two and the Montgomeries of Bourtreehill held one half whilst the Cunninghamhead family obtained the other.

In 1524 William Cuninghame inherited the lands from his father John and both parts were sold to John Edmeston, Minister of Cardross, whose son John sold them to Jonathan Anderson, a Glasgow Merchant. William Henry Ralston, a cadet of the Ralstons of that Ilk purchased them in 1790 from John, son of Jonathan Edmeston. A nephew, Alexander MacDougal Ralston inherited in 1833. Margaret Fullarton was the wife of Alexander McDougall Ralston. They were buried in Dreghorn parish churchyard. The three sections of Peirstoun were known as Pierstoun-Barclay, Pierstoun-Blair and Pierstoun-Cunninghame. This latter portion is thought to have contained Warrickhill itself.

John Muir of Warwick Mains died in 1875. He was a private in the Ayrshire Yeomanry Cavalry and was accidentally killed by his horse. He was buried in Dreghorn Parish Churchyard.

=== The Craig Estate ===
The Craig estate of the Dunlop family and later the Pollok-Morris family lies within the ancient Barony of Robertoun, situated above Laigh Milton Mill and leading down to the River Irvine. The original house was located in what was later to become the walled garden. The present Craig House, further up the hill, dates from c1780 and was enlarged c1835 and a portico and perron added by Kilmarnock architect James Ingram. The building was further enlarged in 1882 by architect Allan Stevenson with the west wing and in 1902 with the addition of the Winter Garden designed by architect Sir John James Burnet. The Pollok Morris family sold the house after WWII to Glasgow Corporation for use as a residential school or 'respite home' for Glasgow boys and later girls. After the school closed in the 1980s the house was vandalised and eventually burnt out with the loss of all the interiors and the portico which had collapsed. It remained a roofless ruin before being acquired by a developer who along with an enabling development of houses in the policies rebuilt the house and reinstated the portico. The interior was not restored but was converted into flats in 2006.

=== The collieries, coal pits and tileworks ===
The 1860, 1898–1904 and, 1911 and 1912 OS maps all show that the extent to which Springside was surrounded by collieries, coal pits and freight only railway or 'tram' lines. Collieries were located near Cauldhame farm (Cauldhame and Springhill (Pit No.4), Bankhead (one called West Thorntoun), Springhill (Pit No.1) and Springhill (Pit No.2) at Springhill, and another between Busbiehill and Warwickhill. These were all served by standard gauge mineral railway lines, criss-crossing the countryside; they all now lifted, with only a few embankments left to indicate their original course. In 1860 numerous old and current coal pits dotted the area. The waste bing of Springhill (Pit No.3) still lies close to Springside in the field that may have been the Thorntoun deer park. Muirside pit was situated near to the Kirkland miners' row. The access track from Overtoun road is still in use today and is known as the 'pit road'.

The Corsehill tileworks made tiles for drainage and the excavation of clay lead to the creation of several large ponds. Swans nested on an islet in one of these ponds and a local football team from the area was called "The Swans". Some of the flooded claypits remain as part of a walkway and community woodland.

=== Miner's rows ===
Springside had many, built by the mine owners for their workers. Corsehill, Sprigside and Bankhead were constructed by J & R. Howie, Archibald Finnie & Sons and A. Kenneth & Sons. Others rows were at nearby Overtoun, also Warwickhill row, and Kirkland row.

=== The railway ===
The station looking towards Dreghorn in the 19th century

Springside railway station or Halt opened in 1890, and closed permanently to passengers on 6 April 1964. The station never had any freight facilities and trains ran from Kilmarnock to Ardrossan where they connected with Clyde coast steamer services to Arran and Millport. The route had ten return journeys a day in its last timetable before closure. The railway went under the road, however the cutting has been infilled and the whole line from Crosshouse railway station and Busbie junction to Irvine is now a Sustrans cycle path and walkway.

=== The turnpike ===
Springside was on a toll road or turnpike. The name 'turnpike' originated from the original 'gate' used being just a simple wooden bar attached at one end to a hinge on the supporting post. The hinge allowed it to 'open' or 'turn' This bar looked like the 'pike' used as a weapon in the army at that time and therefore we get 'turnpike'.

The term was also used by the military for barriers set up on roads specifically to prevent the passage of horses.

In addition to providing better surfaces and more direct routes, the turnpikes settled the confusion of the different lengths given to miles, which varied from 4,854 to nearly 7,000 feet. Long miles, short miles, Scotch or Scot's miles (5,928 feet), Irish miles (6,720 feet), etc. all existed. 5,280 feet seems to have been an average. Another important point is that when these new toll roads were constructed the turnpike trusts went to a great deal of trouble to improve the route of the new road and these changes could be quite considerable as the old roads tended to go from farm to farm, hardly the shortest route. The tolls on roads were abolished in 1878 to be replaced by a road 'assessment', which was taken over by the county council in 1889.

=== Farms ===
Springhill farm no longer exists, being situated where the main road houses are now. Springside farm is still surrounded by open fields and the well established Kirkland farm is just across the Garrier Burn on the road to Busbiehill.

=== Springside primary school ===
The local primary school was threatened with closure by North Ayrshire Council in 2008 and staff, pupils, parents and local people launched a vigorous campaign to save it. The campaign was featured on national television, local press, etc.

== Micro history ==
The County Council in 1932 planned to demolish most of the old miners' rows, and this was largely carried out, with new housing erected.

At the foot of Thorntoun Brae, just before the Garrier Burn on the right looking towards Thorntoun, was the site of the curling pond.

Etymology
The Garrier's name is thought to be derived, according to McNaught, from the Gaelic 'ruigh or righ' meaning 'fast running water' The Scots word 'Gaw' is also the term given to a 'cut made by a plough' or a furrow or channel made to draw off water.

Springside had a boxing club. Jackie Paterson was born in Springside in 1920 and went on to become Flyweight champion of the World as well as British, European and Empire bantamweight champion. Jackie died in 1966 after emigrating to South Africa.

Strawhorn states in 1951 that a fair number of inhabitants are of Cornish extraction, having been brought up here to break a coal workers strike in the 1880s. They brought names like 'Chynoweth' with them, pronounced 'She-no-ef', Cornish or Kernewek for 'New House'.

Messrs. Archibald Finnie and sons have a rental income of £158 10s 0d in 1912.

Quoiting was a favourite sport in the mining community. The quoiting ground lay near the Springhill Institute.

The Springhill Institute is said to have been erected around the 1840s and used to be the Miner's Welfare Institute. Archibald Finnie of Springhill House had the building constructed and it remained the property of the Finnie family until 1952. Ayr County Council took it over and had the building refurbished and turned it into the Springside Community Centre of today. On the 1895 OS map, a smithy is marked in the position where the community centre is now located, giving some doubt as to the date of the institute construction as being in the 1840s. The revised 1905 map shows the institute and a smithy to the right of it where a small housing development of that name has recently been built (2006–07).

Springside – 2007

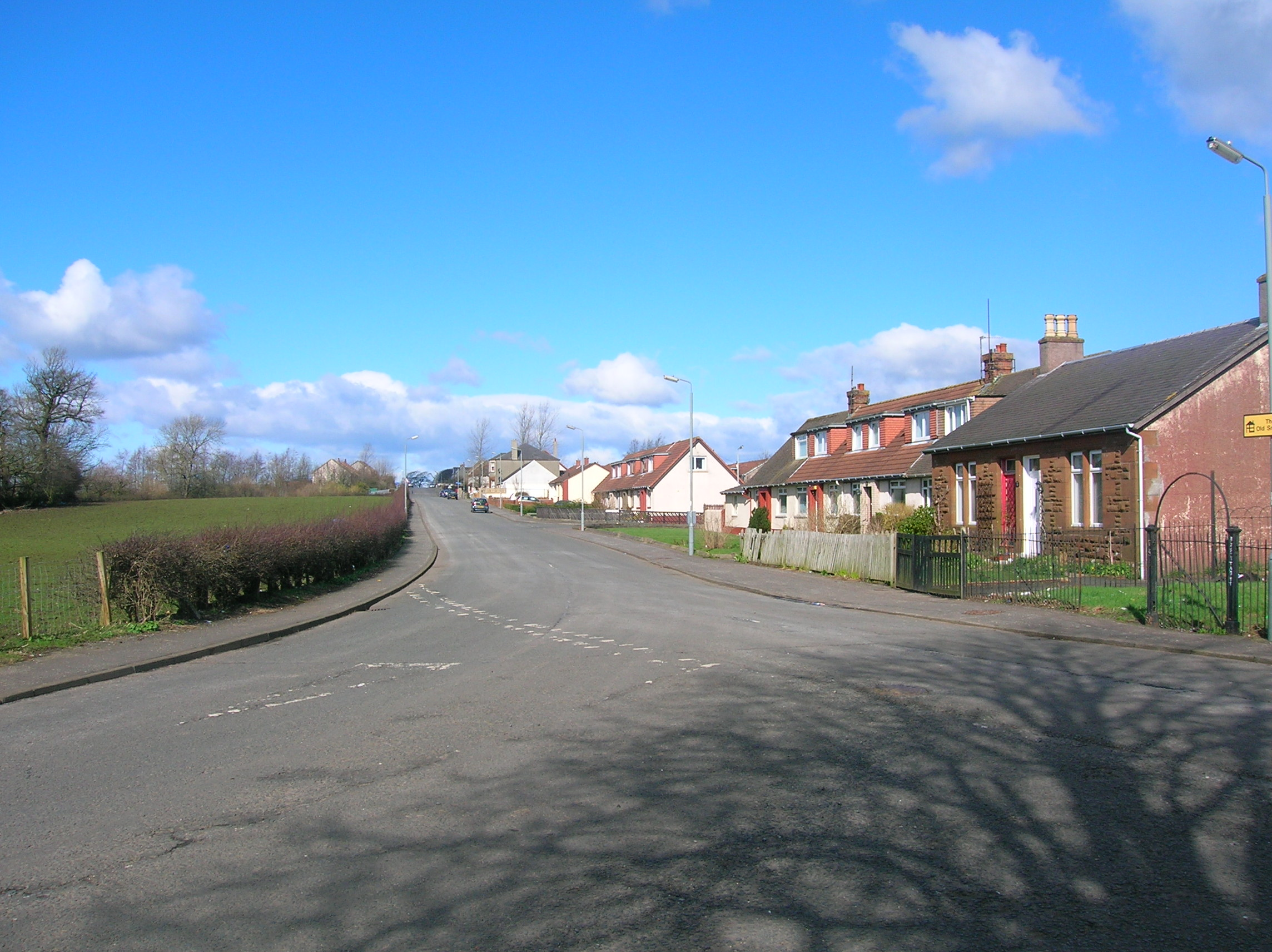
Looking down towards Overton from the institute

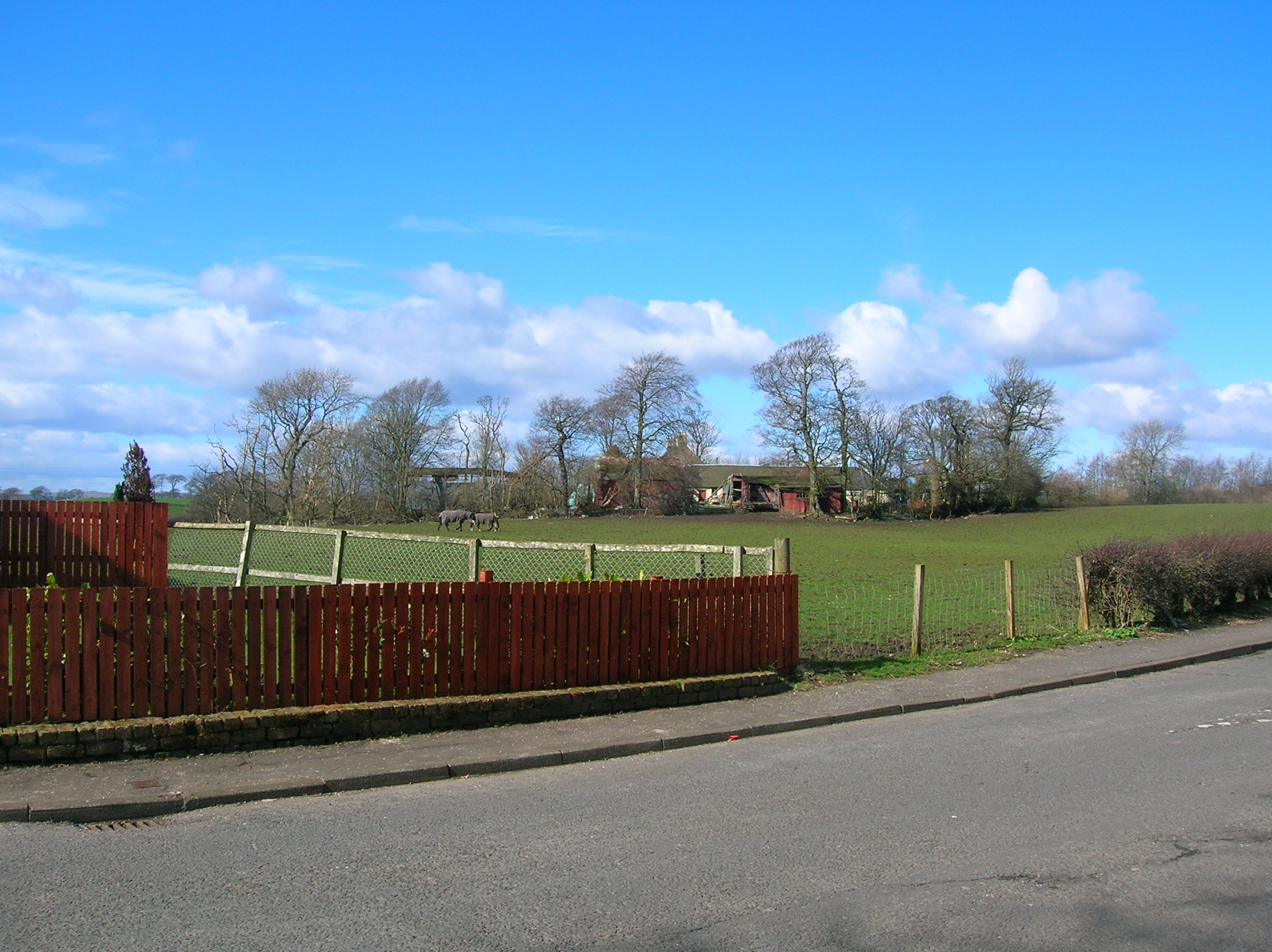
Springside farm from the institute

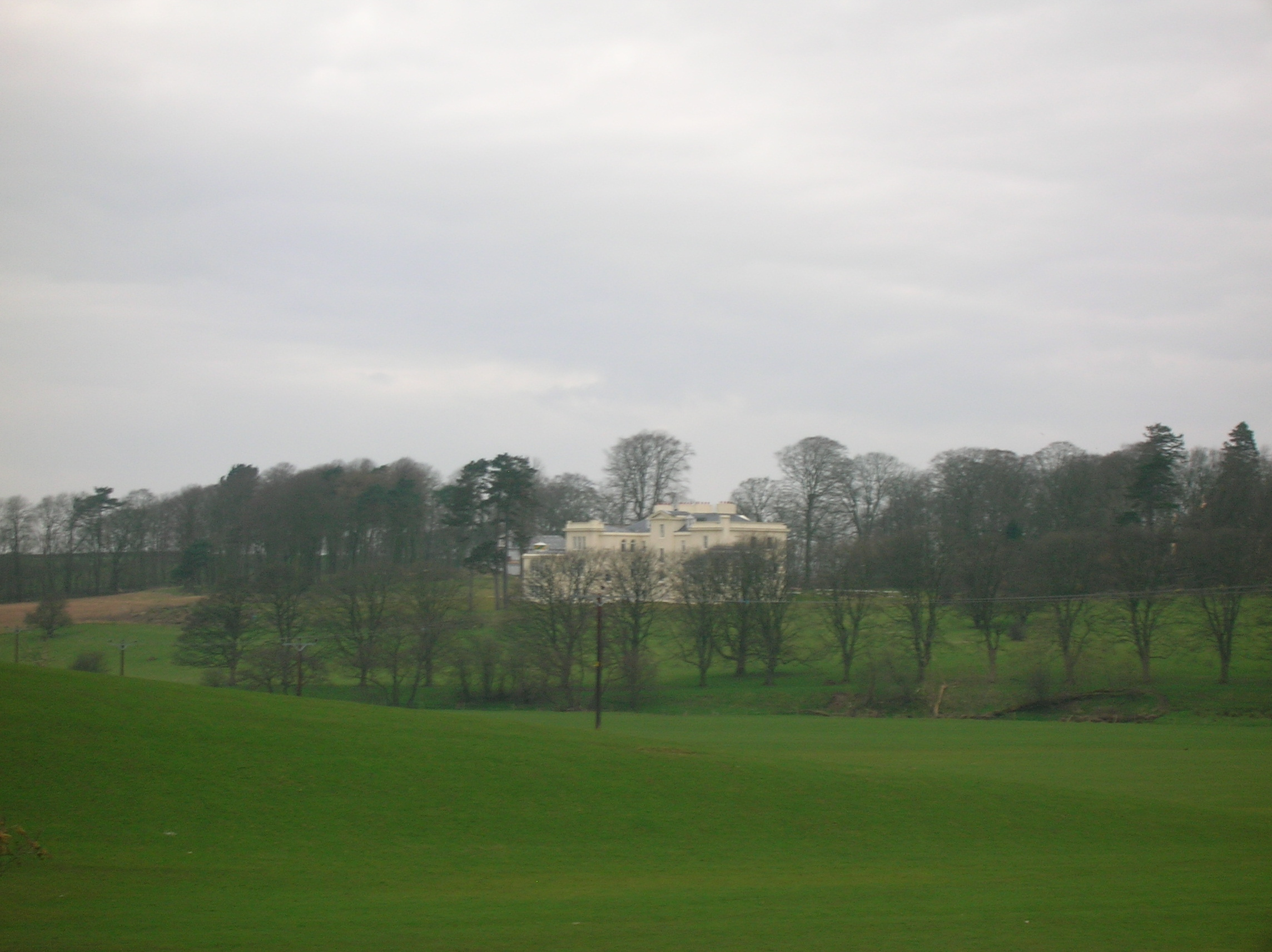
Craig House from Laigh Milton viaduct

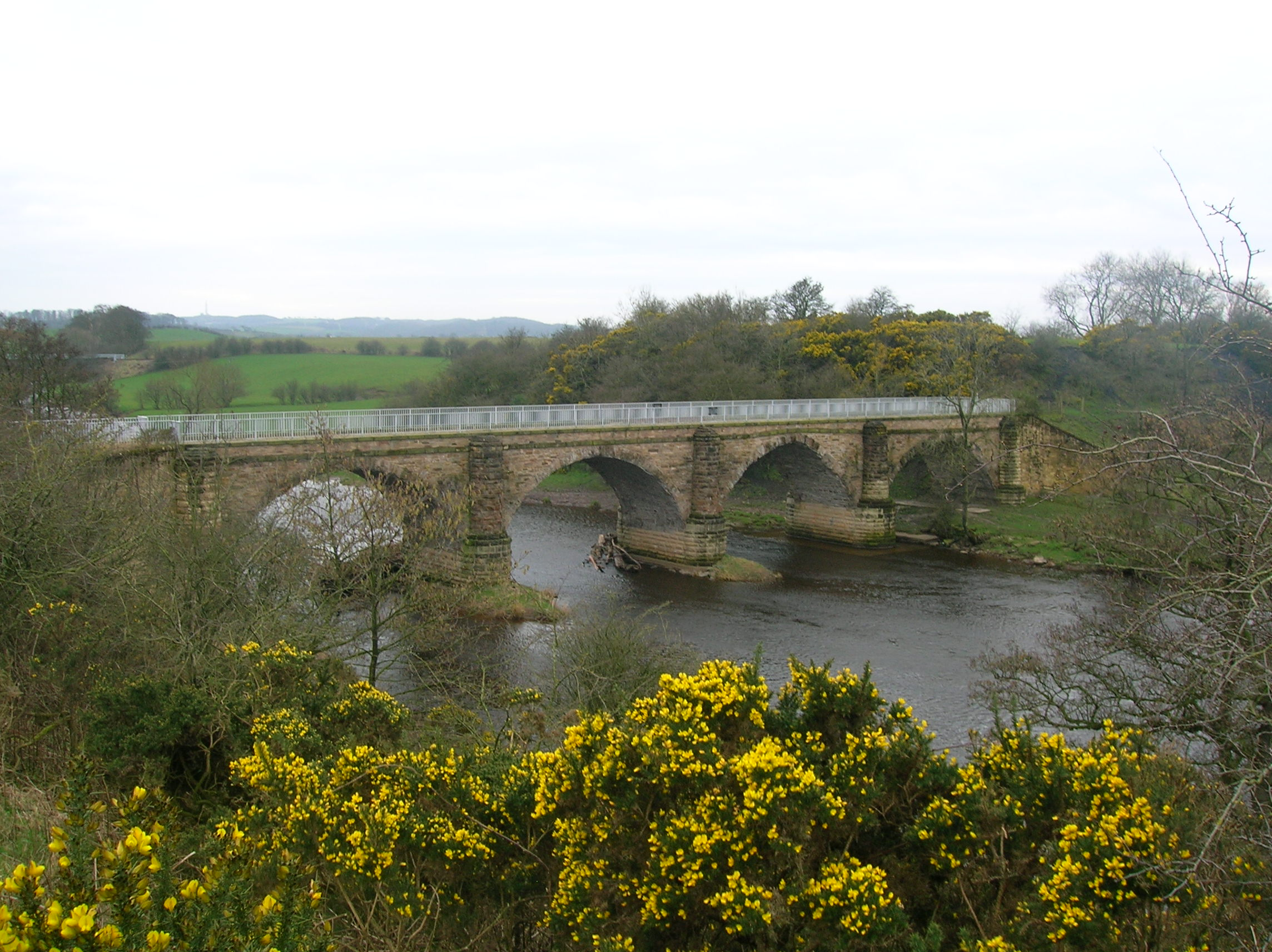
Laigh Milton viaduct and the old waste bings of Fairlie Colliery (Pit No.3)

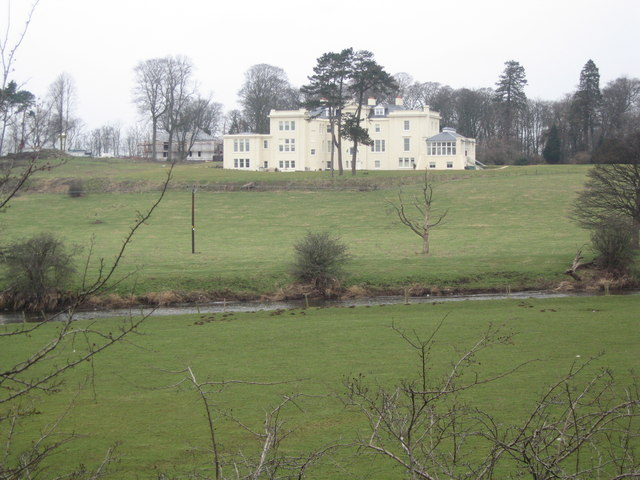
Craig House from the River Irvine

A plant nursery used to exist between the institute and the Garrier, this is remembered in the street name 'Nursery Row'. The village was well supplied with missions, two being shown on the revised 1908 OS. One has been demolished, but the other survives as a quaint ruin in 2007. The Finnies, coalmasters, lived at Springhill in Kilmarnock. Springhill is now a nursing home.

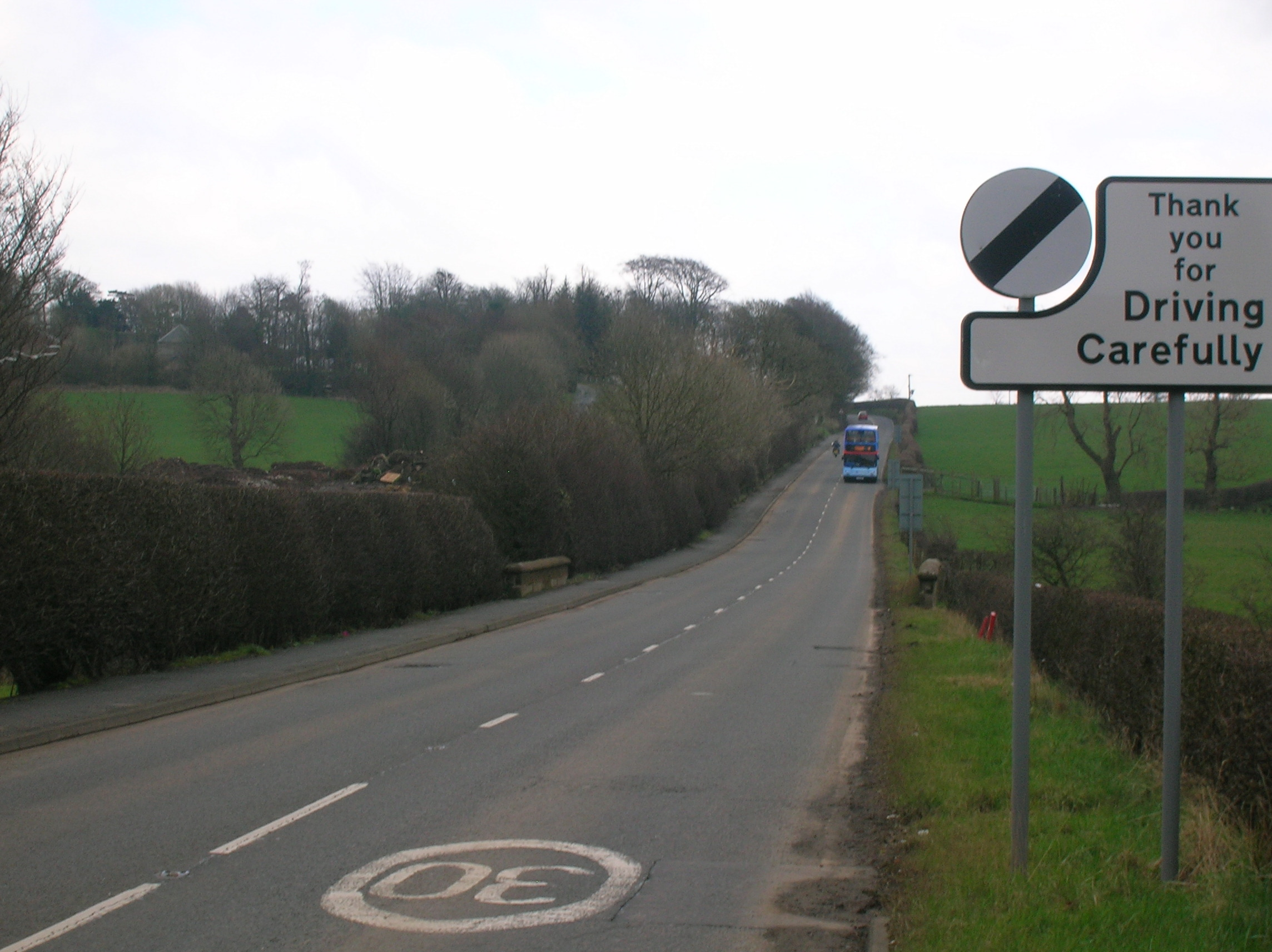
Thorntoun Brae and bridge viewed from Springside

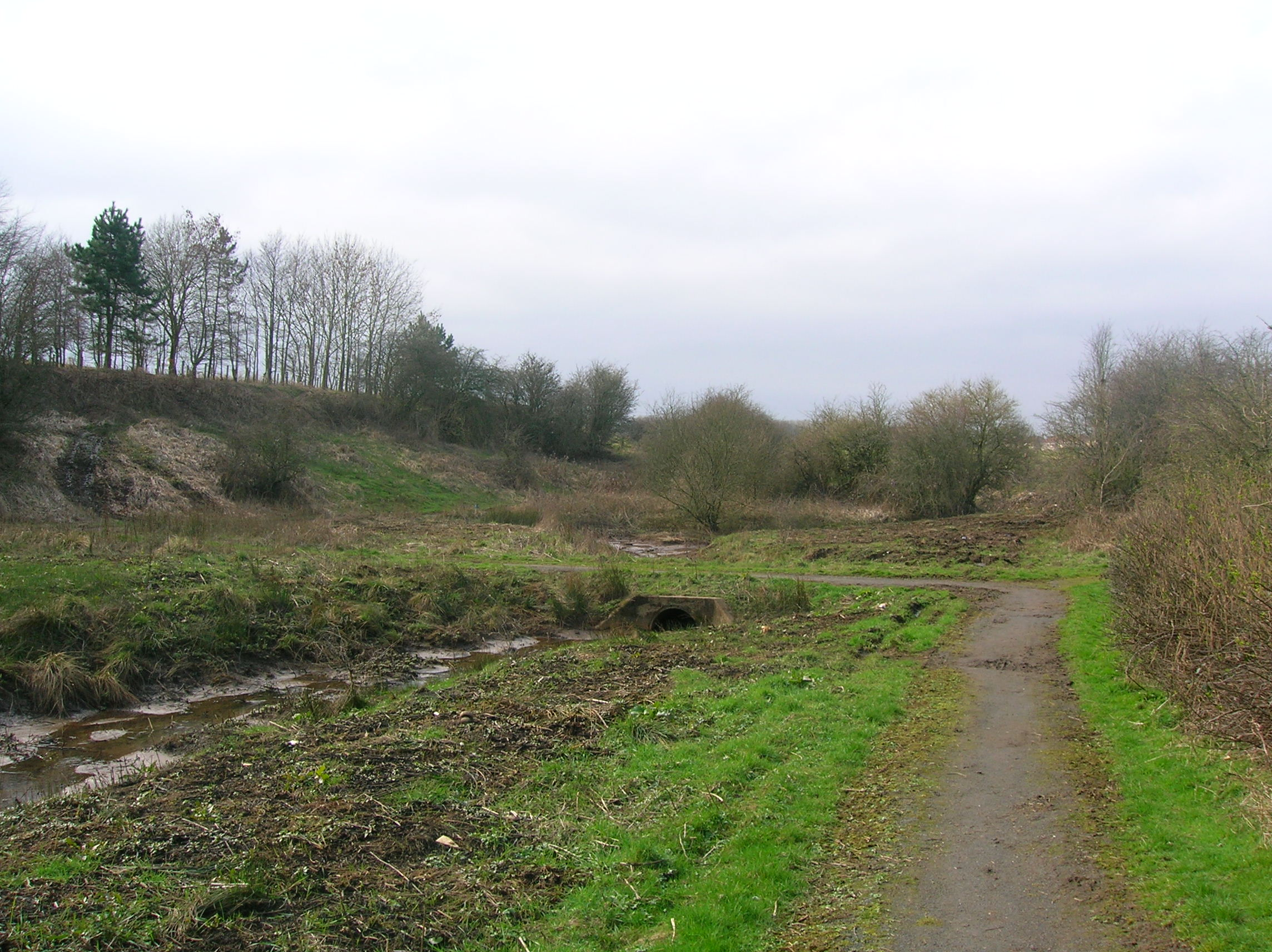
The claypit ponds and community woodlands at the old tileworks

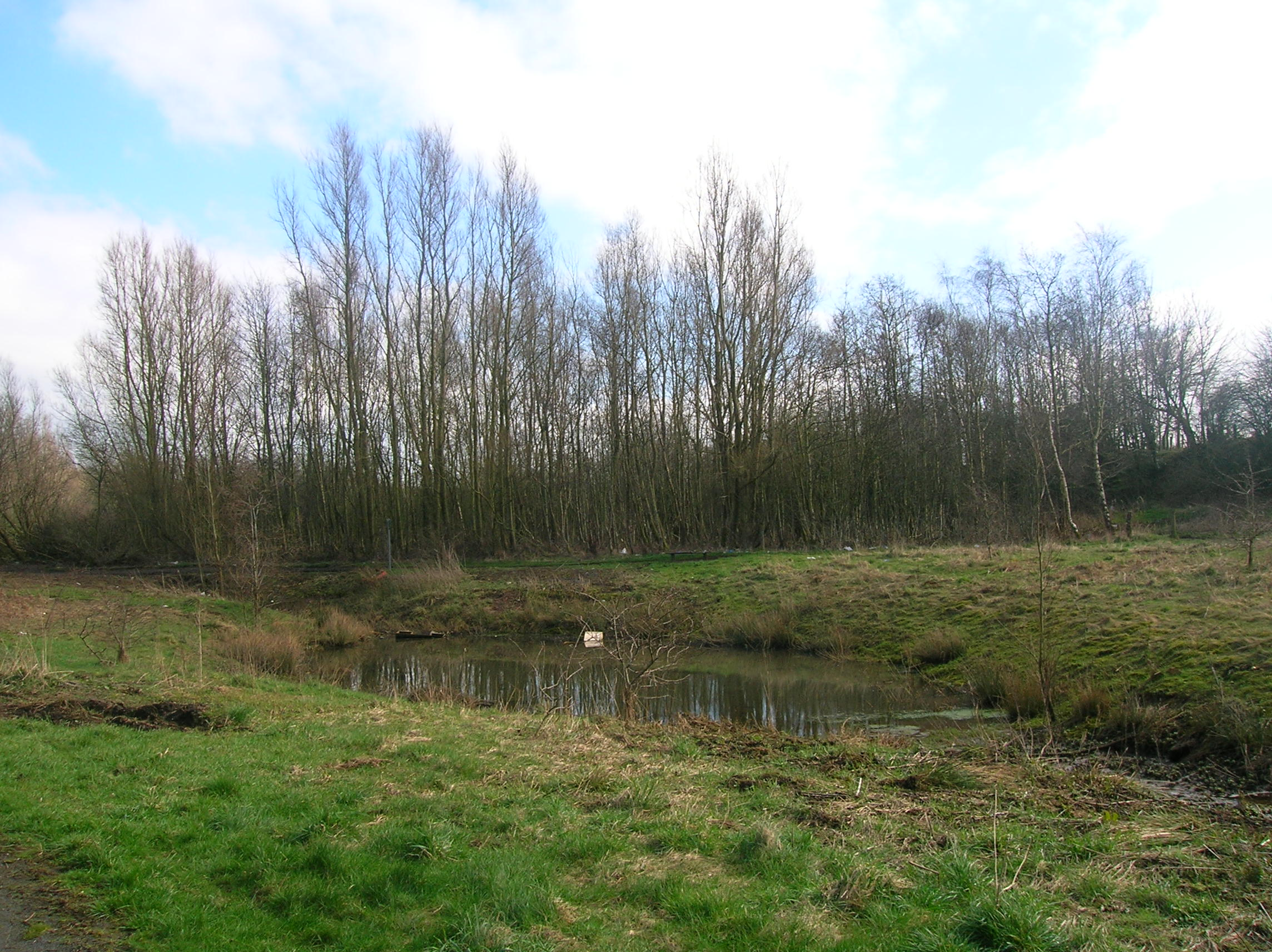
The claypit ponds and community woodlands at the old tileworks

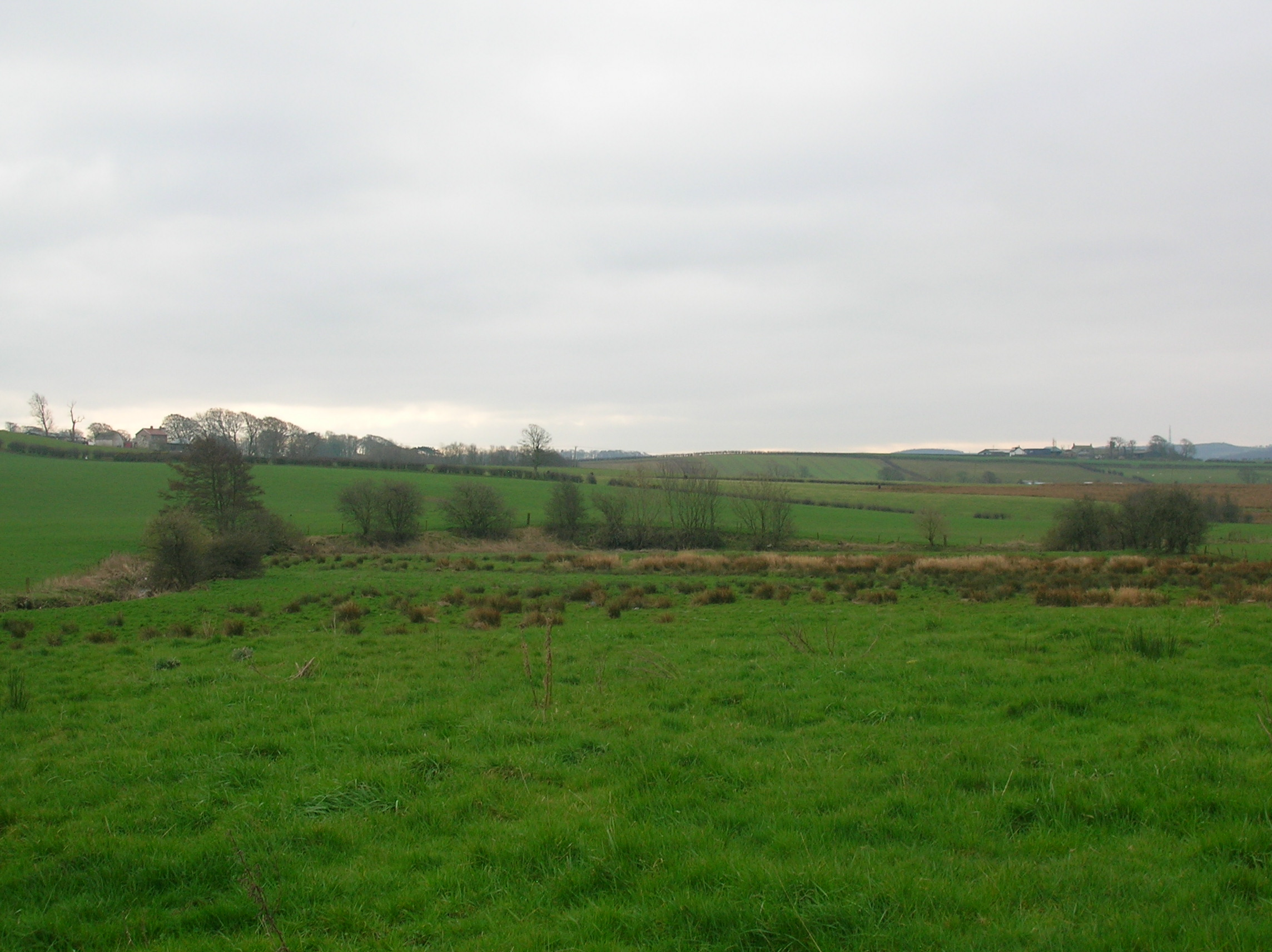
Fairlie woods and Gatehead from Springside
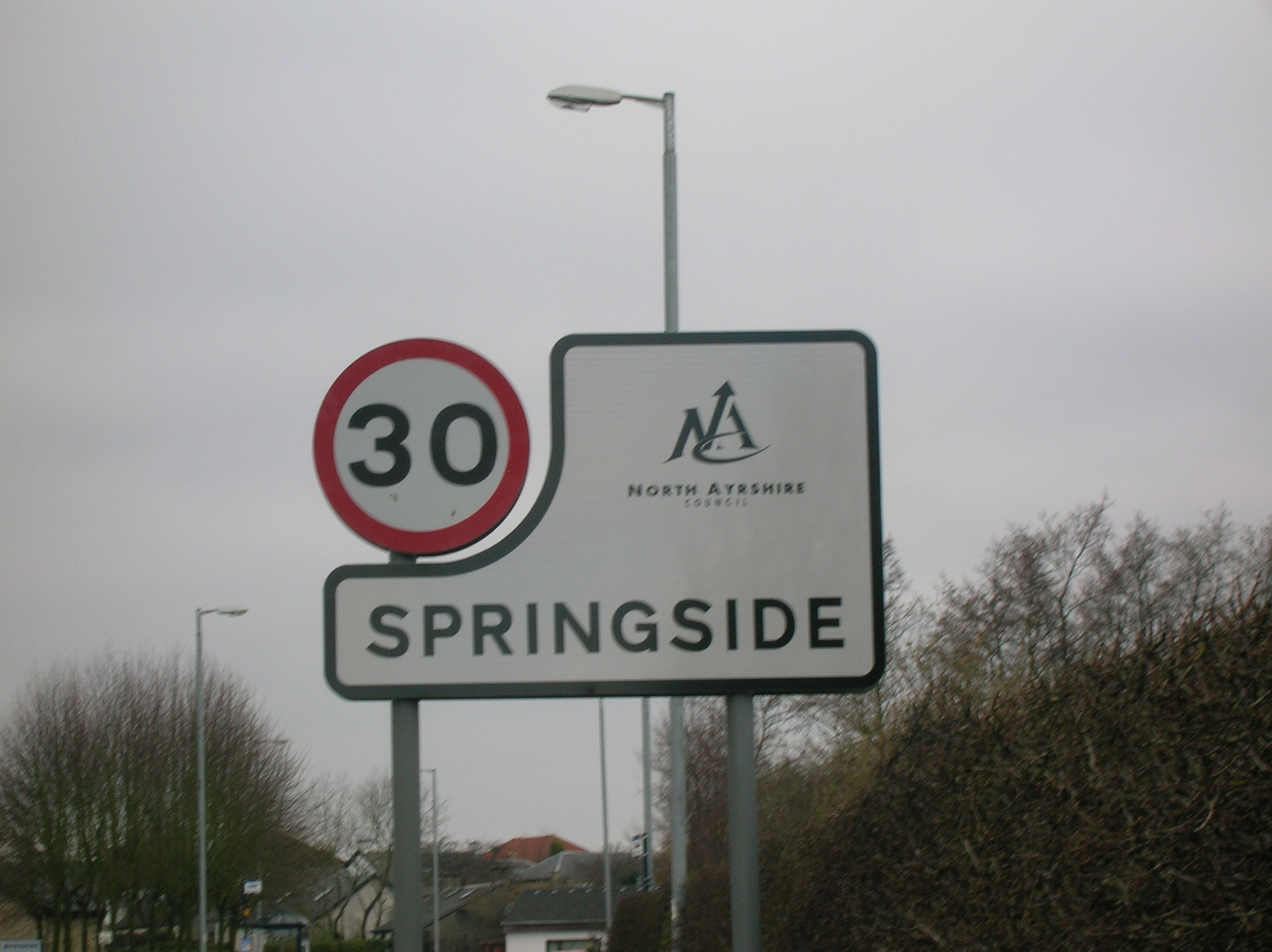
Springside, North Ayrshire

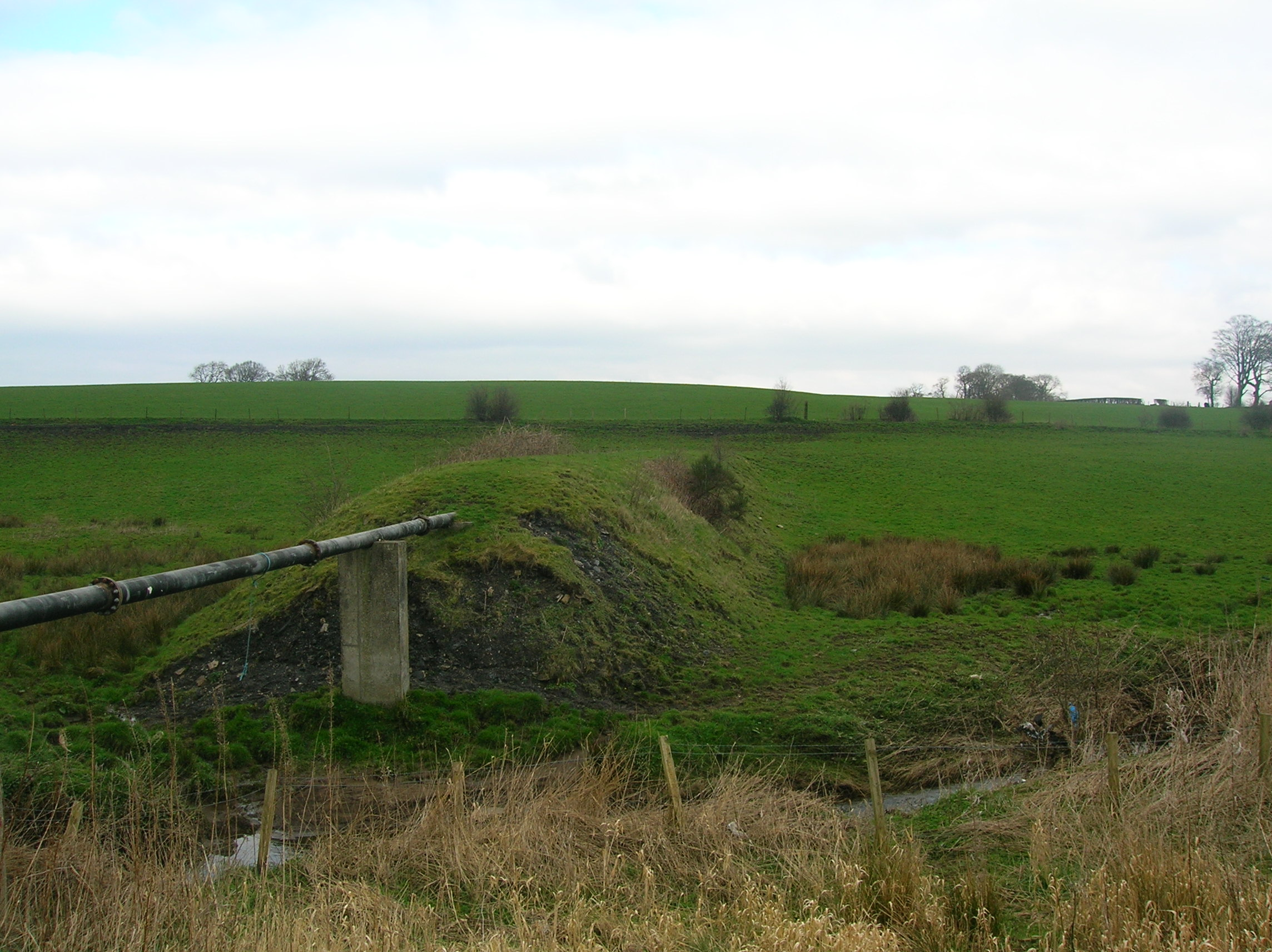
Mineral line embankment at the Garrier burn

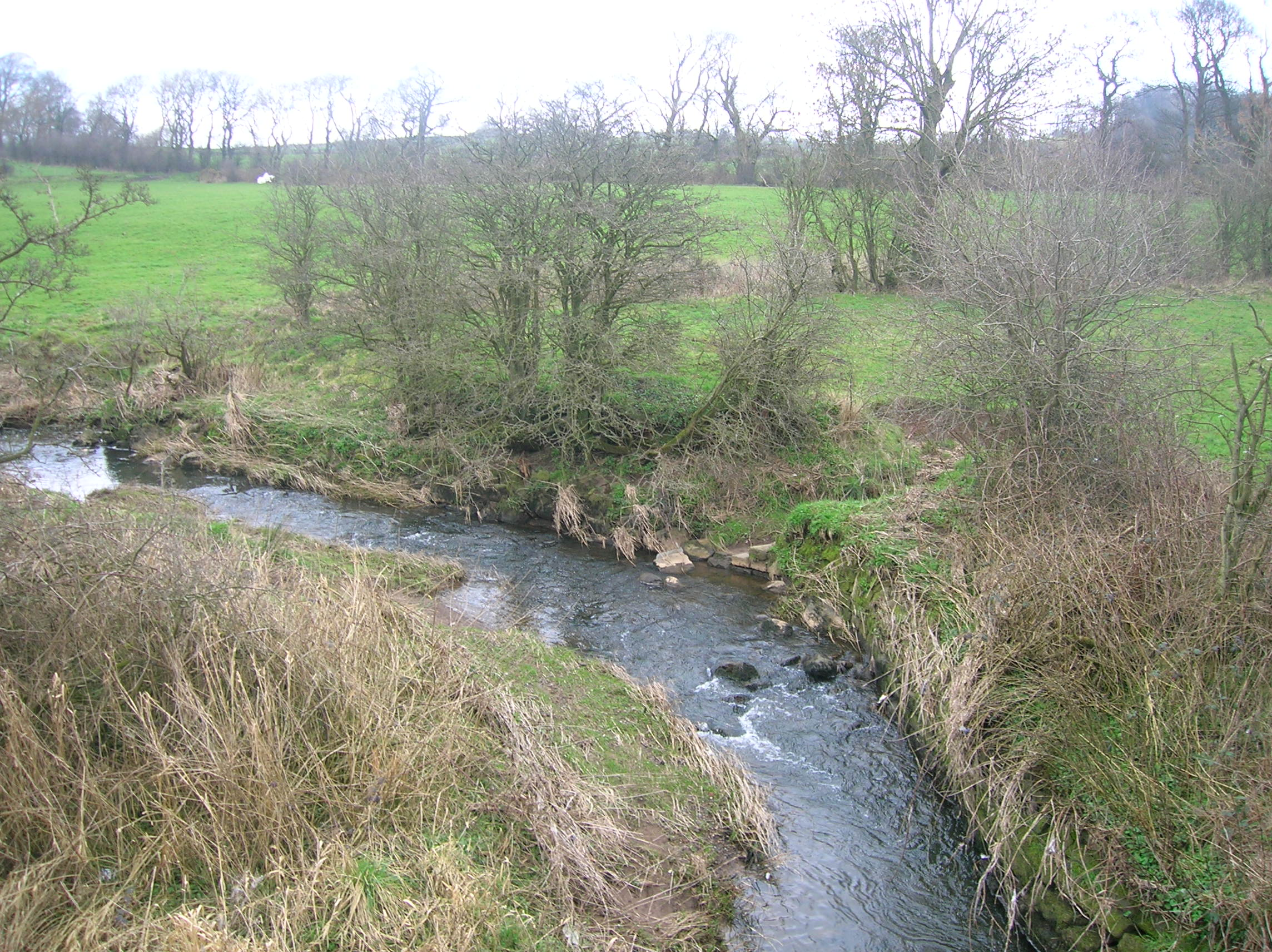
The Garrier Burn from Thorntoun Bridge

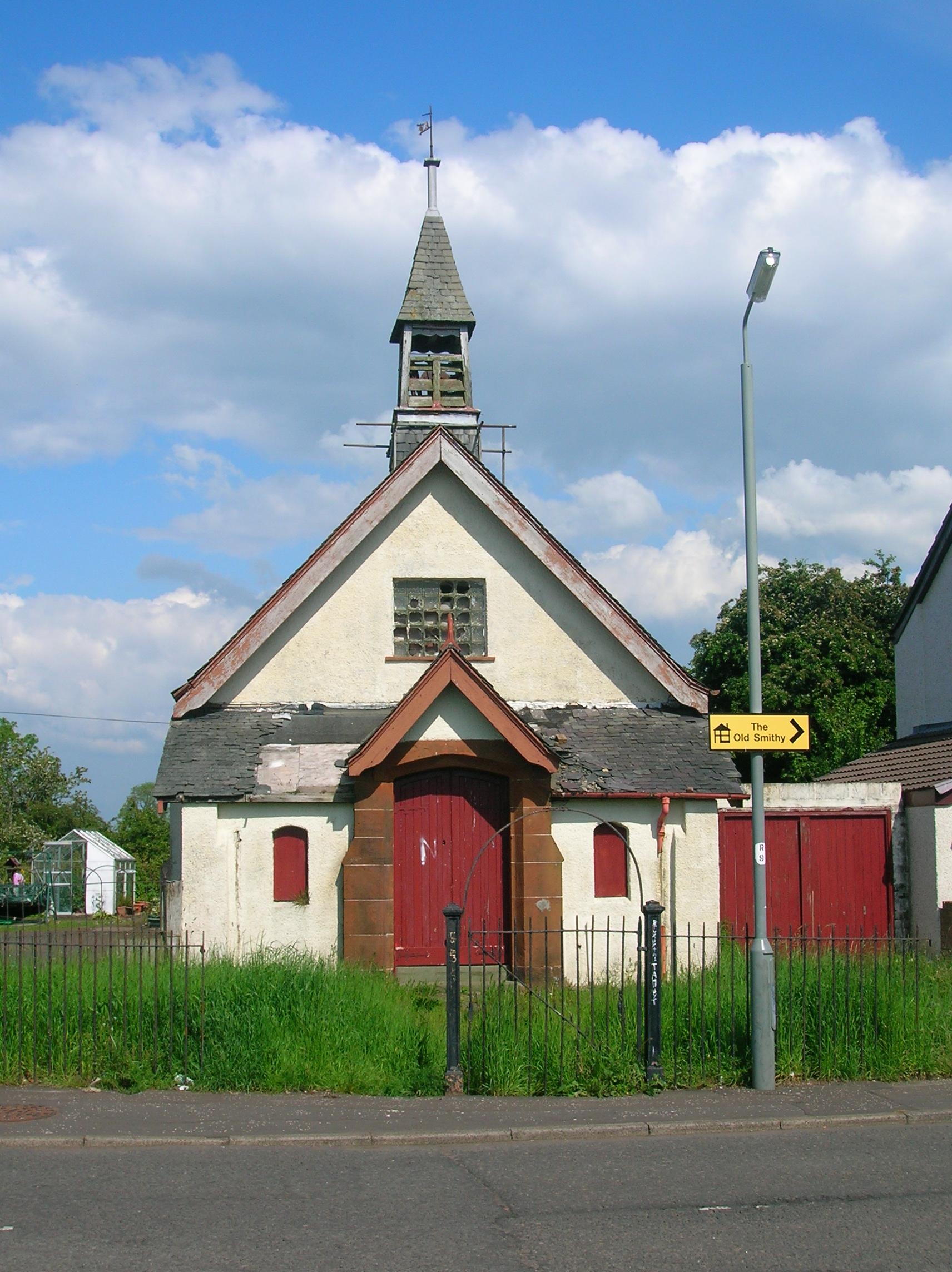
The old mission church next to the 'Springhill Institute'

The 'Pit Road' led to the old Muirside Pit. running towards the cyclepath and pit remains.

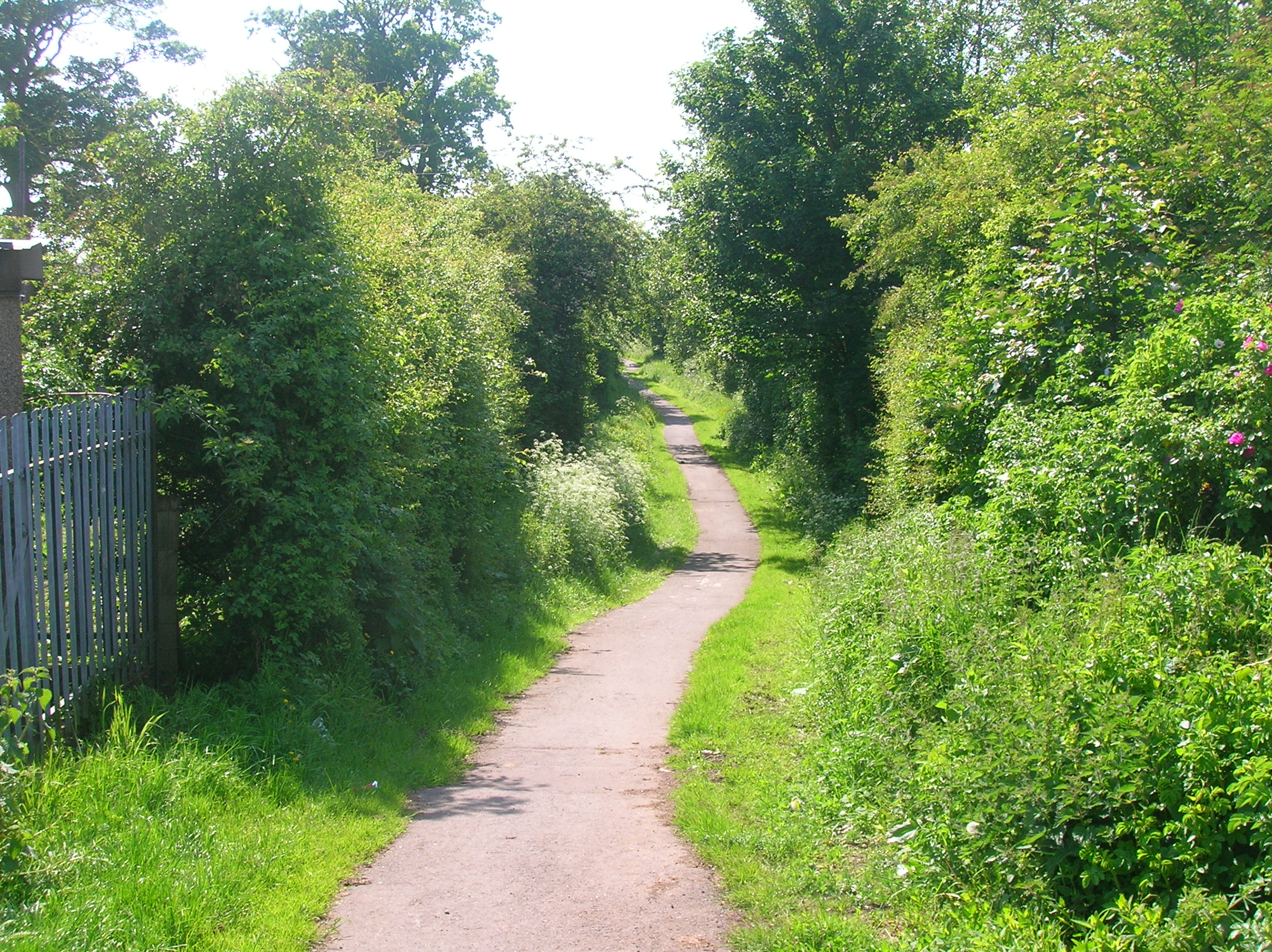
The Sustrans cyclepath looking towards Dreghorn

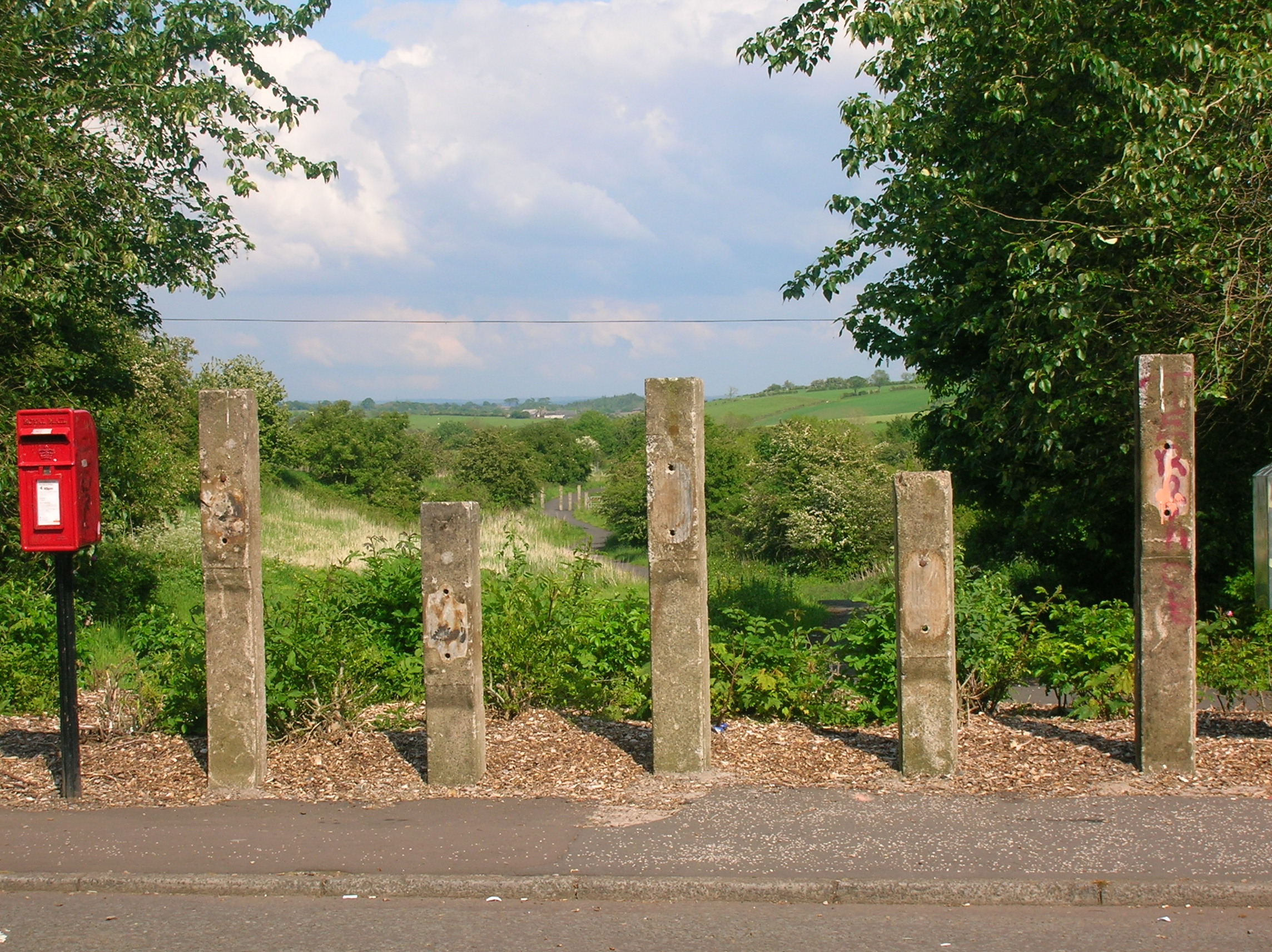
The cyclepath looking towards the old Crosshouse Junction at Knockentiber

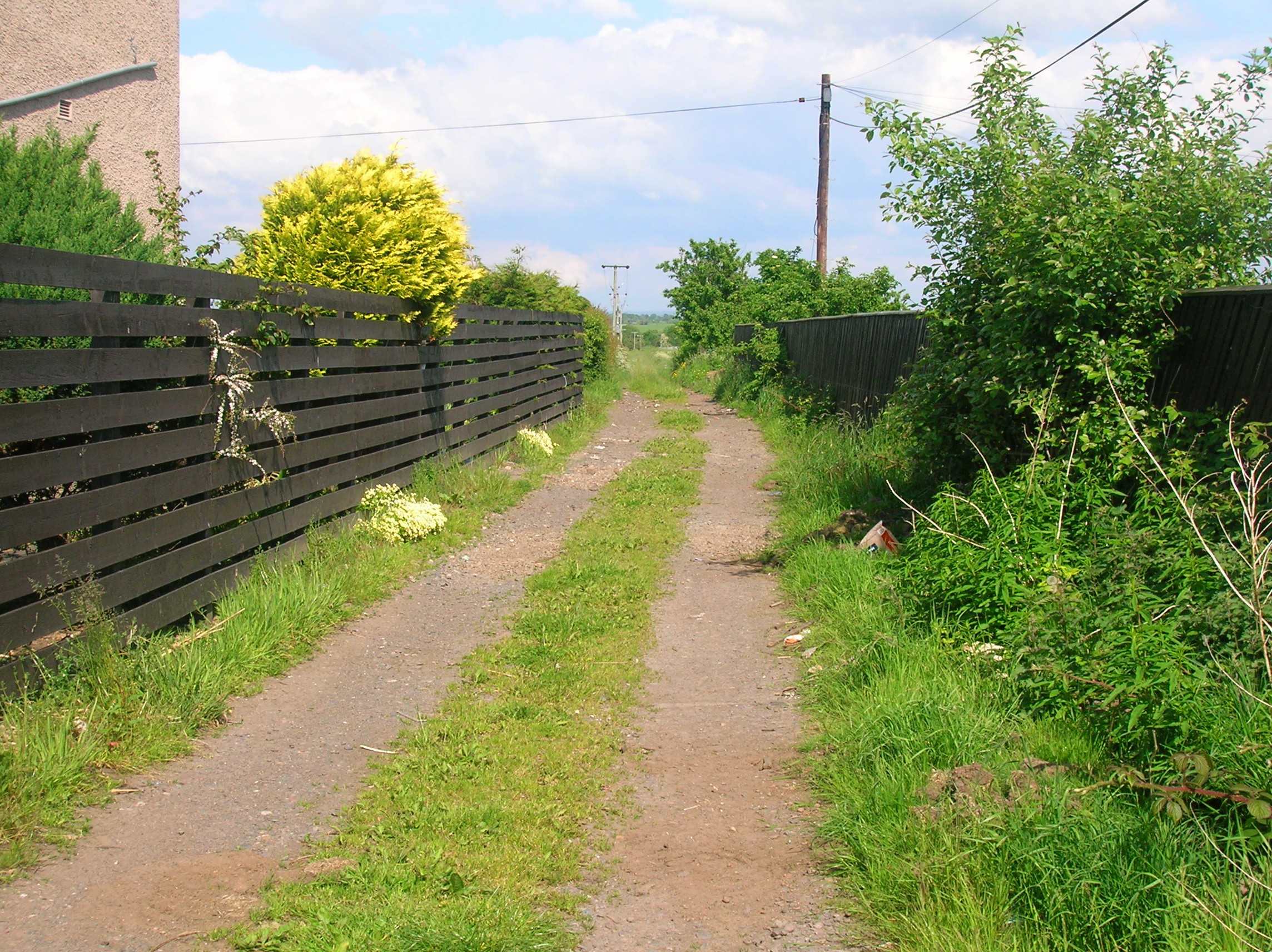
The 'Pit Road'

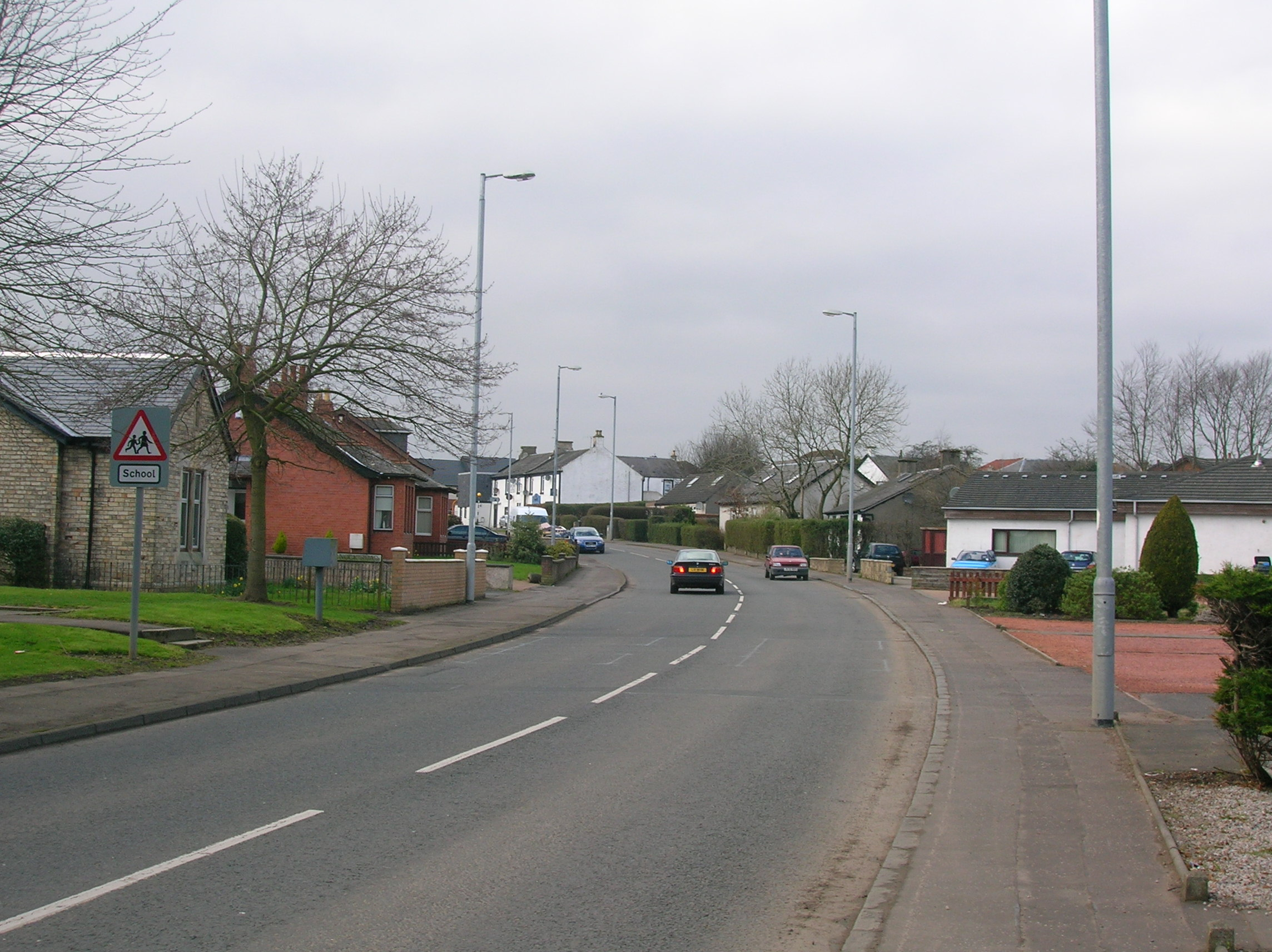
Springside main street and Scott's Corner, formerly 'The Croft'

'Arran View' is an example of one of the early privately owned houses built in around 1902. The land was purchased from the Finnies, owners of Springhill House, Forber House and Thorntoun House.

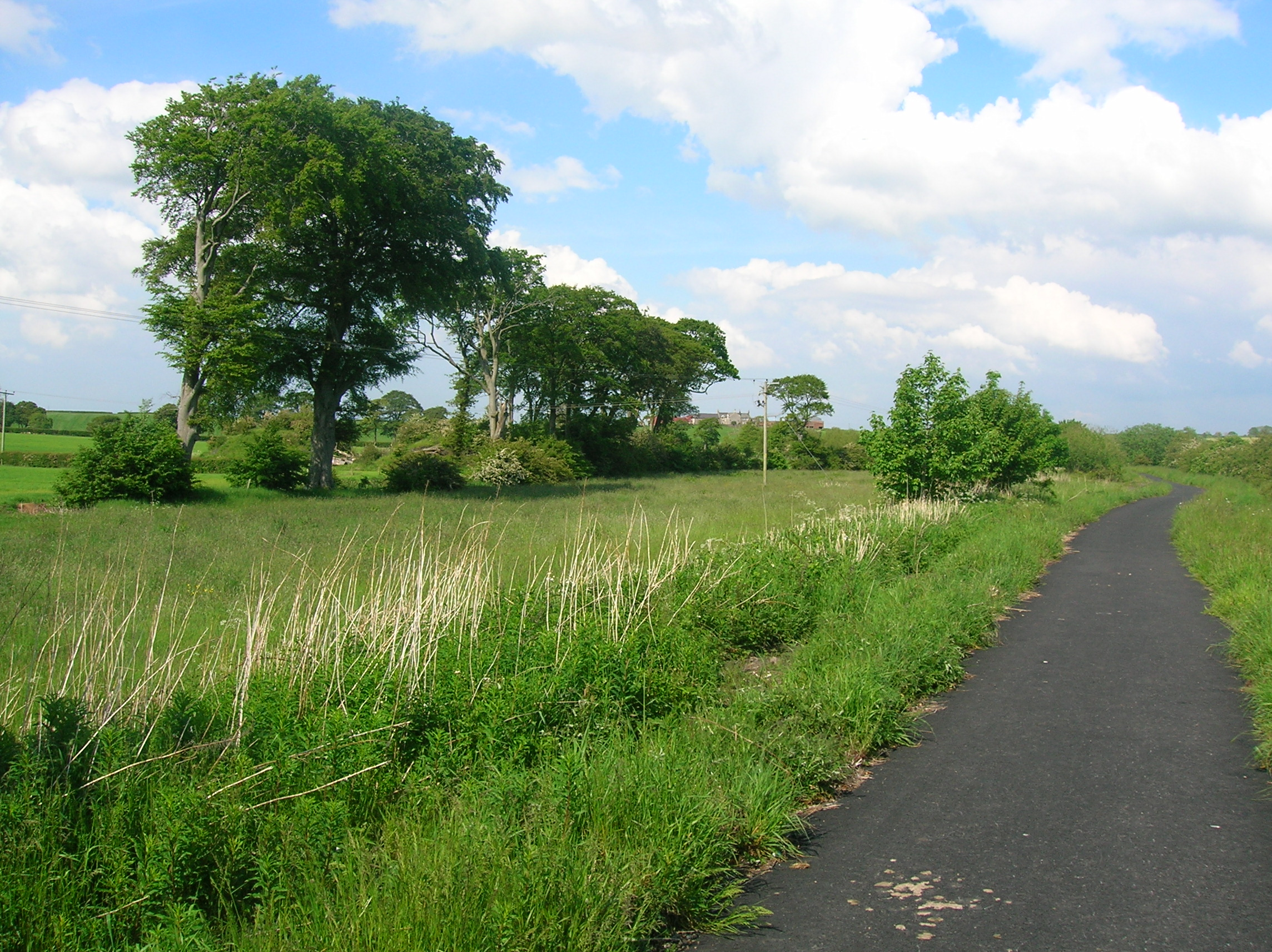
A view of one of the old coal pits off the cyclepath. The beech trees are growing on the banks of the Garrier Burn.

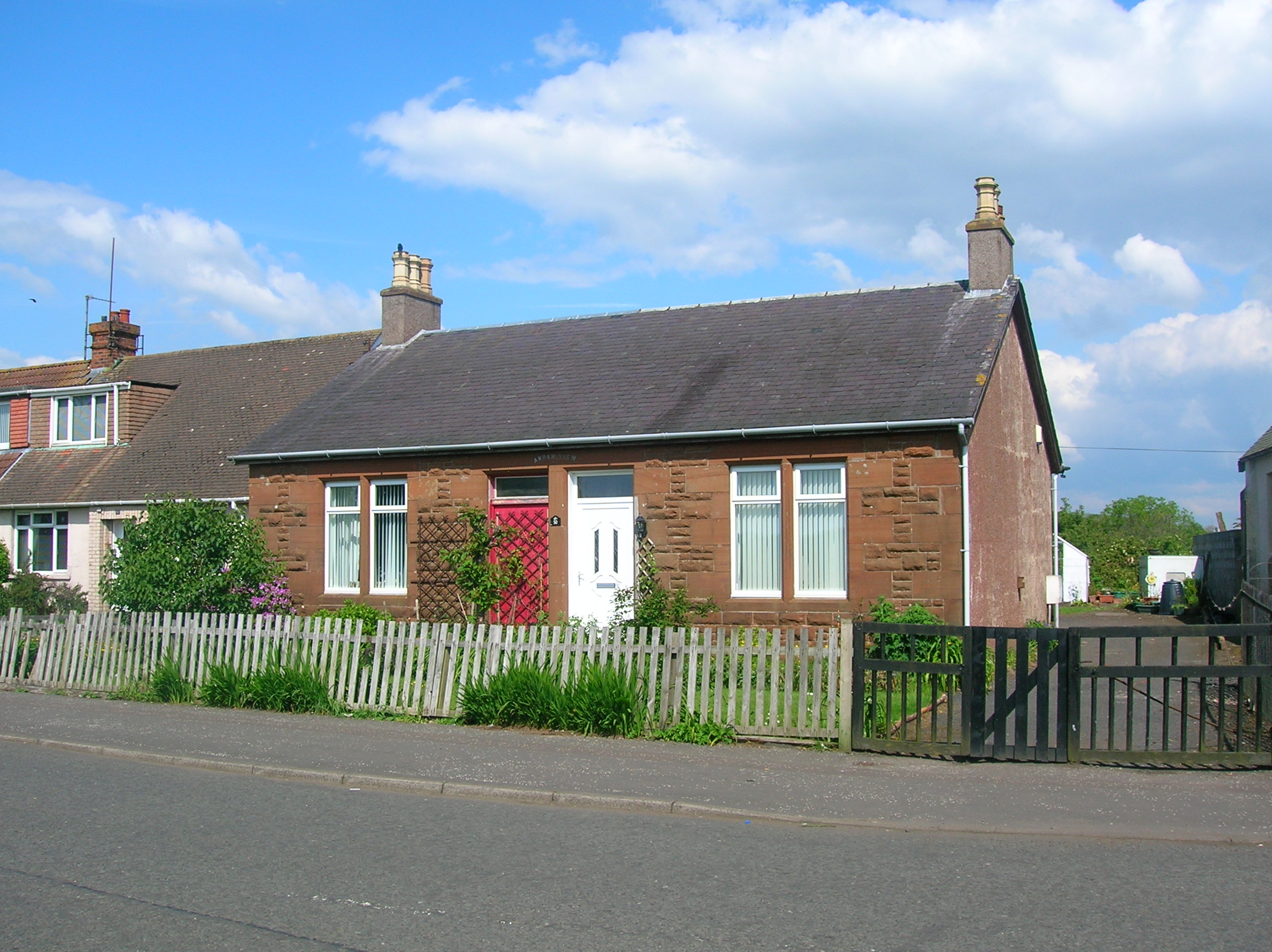
Arran View
