= Springside railway station =

Former railway station in Scotland

Springside
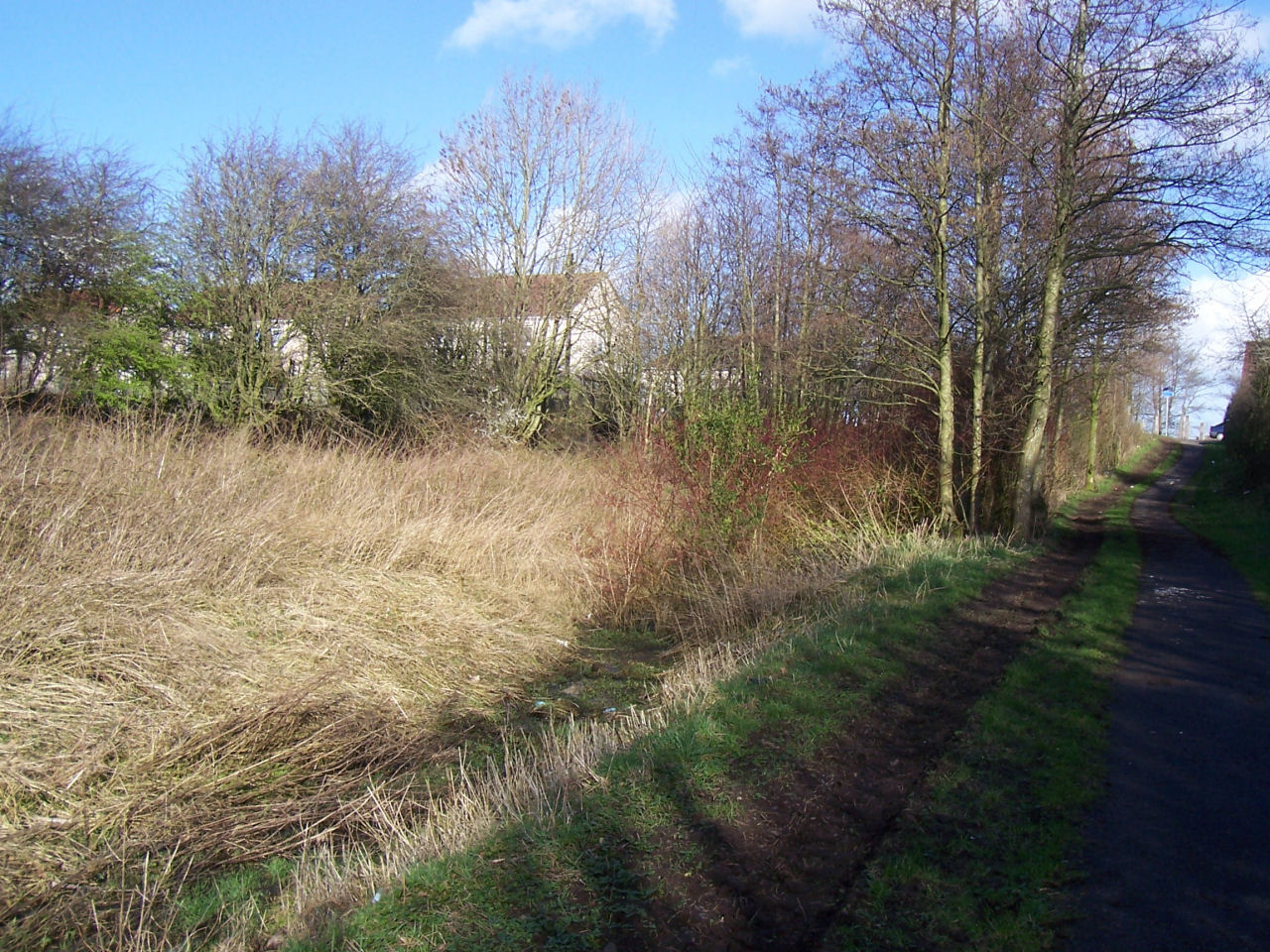
- The site of Springside in 2007

General information
- Location: Springside, Ayrshire; Scotland
- Coordinates: 55.61809°N 4.59203°W
- Platforms: 2

Other information
- Status: Disused

History
- Original company: Glasgow, Paisley, Kilmarnock and Ayr Railway
- Pre-grouping: Glasgow and South Western Railway
- Post-grouping: LMS

Key dates
- 1890: Opened
- 6 April 1964: Closed
Location

Springside railway station was a railway station serving the village of Springside, North Ayrshire, Scotland. The station was originally part of the Glasgow, Paisley, Kilmarnock and Ayr Railway.

== History ==
The station opened in 1890, and closed permanently to passengers on 6 April 1964. Also known as Springside Halt, this station had no freight facilities. The line between Irvine and Crosshouse continued to be used by trains until October 1965. The last passenger train through the station was a Kilmaurs Sunday Schools special train to Ardrossan (South Beach) on Saturday, 20 June 1964.

Originally Springside had a siding and a signal box, operated by a signalman who came down from Crosshouse on the shunt; once the day's work had been completed the signalman would catch the next available train back to Crosshouse. Springside was linked to Springhill collieries numbers 1, 2, 3, and 4, as well as Cauldhame colliery. All these single track lines linked to the siding and were worked by the usual 'Pug' engines. Latterly the station was an unstaffed halt.

About 300 yards from the station was another siding known locally as 'The Hurries', serving Springside Number 10 colliery. A horse-operated line, 'The Bogie Line', ran up from the pit, conveying the hutches to be unloaded into trucks waiting at the siding.

Preceding station	Historical railways	Following station
Crosshouse; Line and station closed	Glasgow and South Western Railway; Glasgow, Paisley, Kilmarnock and Ayr Railway	Dreghorn; Line and station closed

== Views of the station ==
The station looking towards Dreghorn in the 19th century.

An 'occasion' at the station in the 19th century.

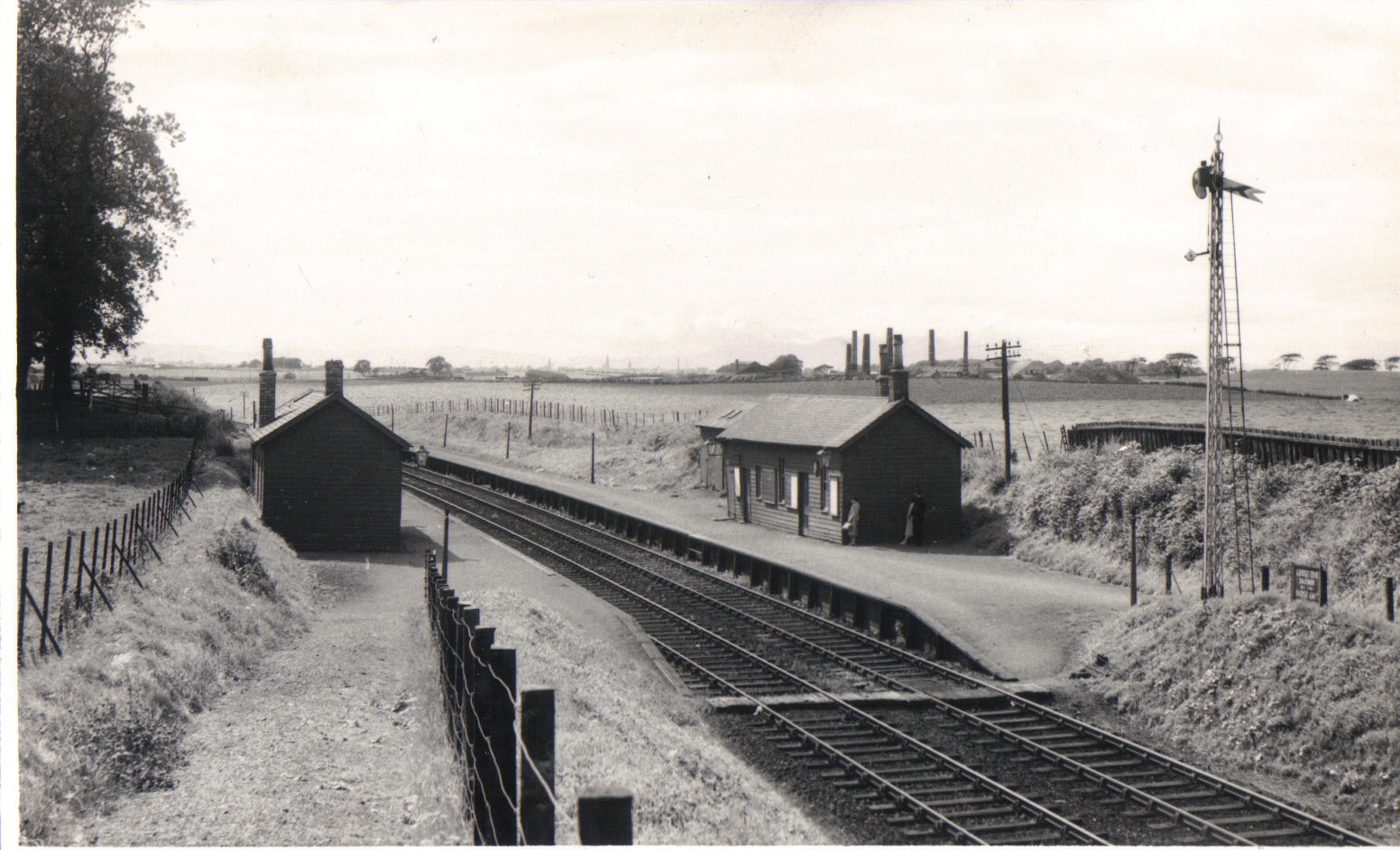
The station in 1957.
