= Crosshouse railway station =

Former railway station in Scotland

Coordinates: 55.6244°N 4.5429°W

Crosshouse
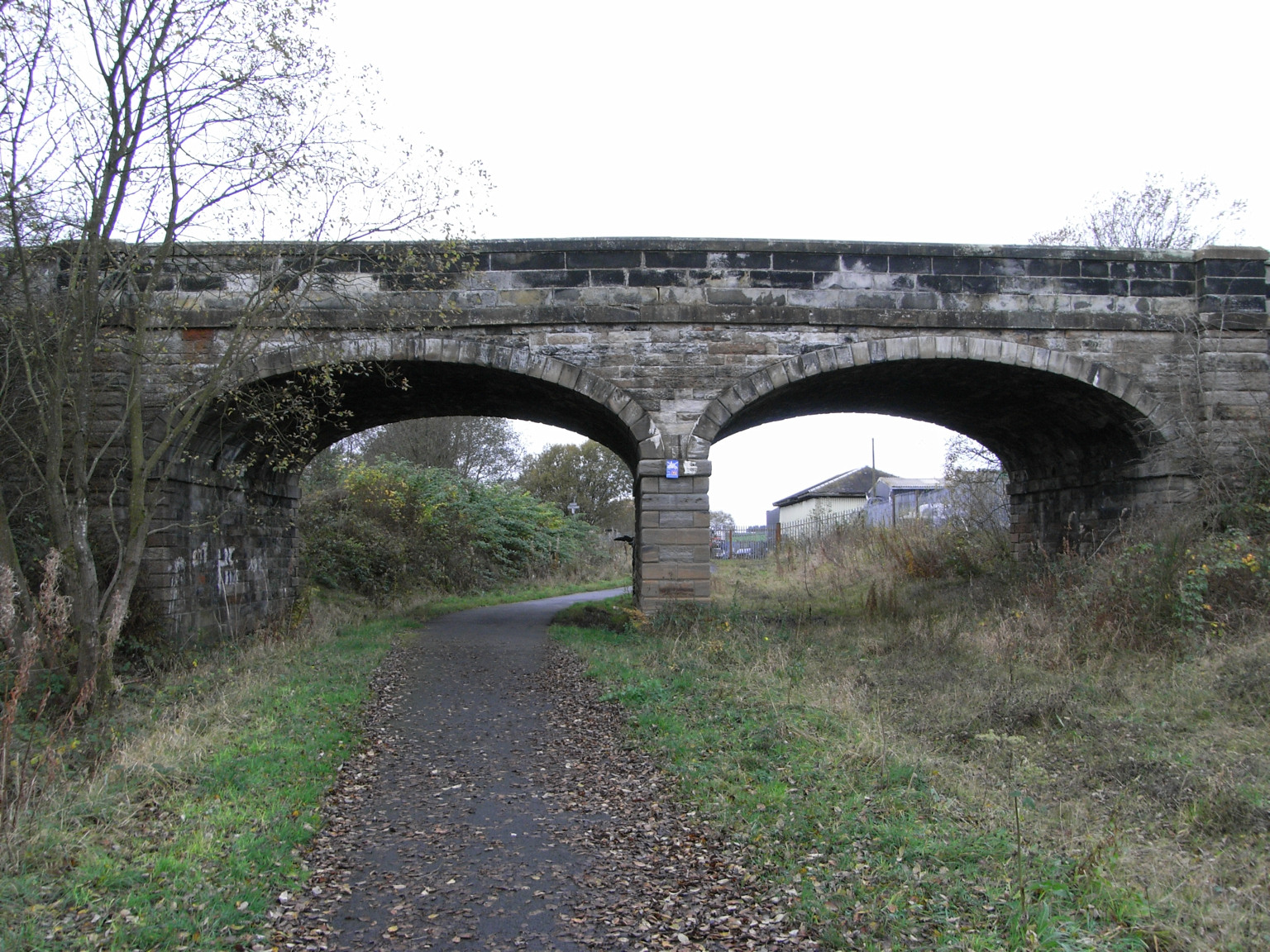
- The site of Crosshouse in 2007

General information
- Location: Crosshouse, Ayrshire; Scotland
- Platforms: 4

Other information
- Status: Disused

History
- Original company: Glasgow, Paisley, Kilmarnock and Ayr Railway
- Pre-grouping: Glasgow and South Western Railway
- Post-grouping: London, Midland and Scottish Railway

Key dates
- 4 April 1843: Opened as Busby
- 15 April 1850: Closed
- 1 September 1872: Reopened as Crosshouse
- 18 April 1966: Closed permanently
Location

Crosshouse railway station was a railway station serving the village of Knockentiber and nearby Crosshouse, East Ayrshire, Scotland. The station was originally part of the Glasgow, Paisley, Kilmarnock and Ayr Railway.

== History ==
The station opened on 4 April 1843 as Busby. Busby station had a short life and closed on 15 April 1850, however the station reopened as Crosshouse (then as part of the Glasgow and South Western Railway) on 1 September 1872.

Crosshouse and its four platforms served as a junction station, allowing travel to Kilmarnock from the directions of both Irvine and Dalry. The Irvine service was withdrawn on 6 April 1964, with the station closing permanently to passengers on 18 April 1966, although the line was still in use by freight trains and diverted passenger trains until 23 October 1973.

The former railway workers' house which stands at 40 Kilmaurs Road is now a place of private residence, comprising stables and fields.

Preceding station	Historical railways	Following station
Kilmarnock; Line closed; station open	Glasgow and South Western Railway; Glasgow, Paisley, Kilmarnock and Ayr Railway	Springside; Line and station closed
Kilmarnock; Line closed; station open	Glasgow and South Western Railway; Glasgow, Paisley, Kilmarnock and Ayr Railway	Cunninghamhead; Line and station closed
