= National Cycle Route 73 =

Cycle route in the United Kingdom

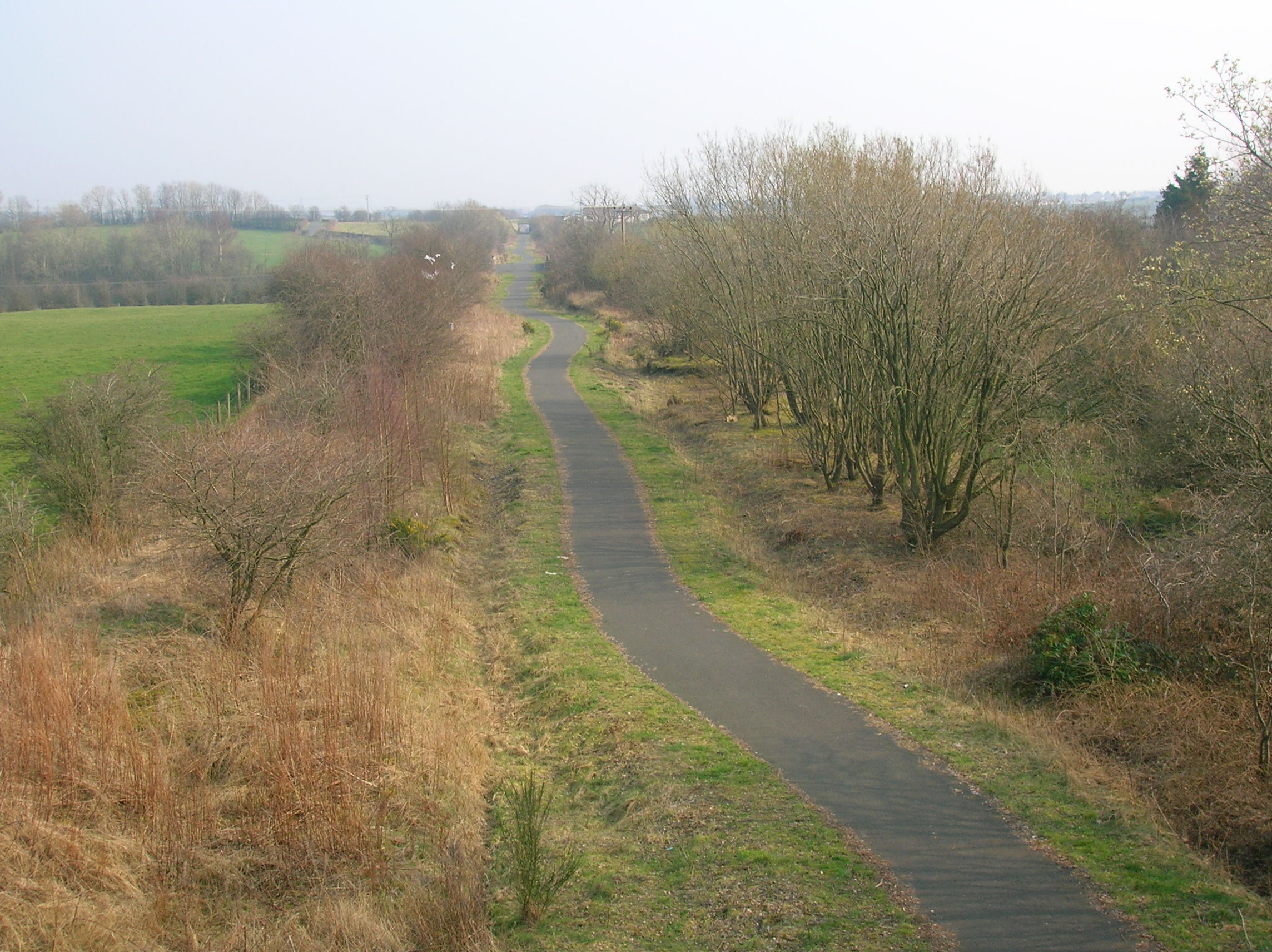
National Cycle Route 73 at Knockentiber

National Cycle Route 73 runs from Newton Stewart to Kintyre.

The Kilmarnock to Ardrossan section is often known as the Cunninghame cycleway.

== Route ==
=== Kilmarnock to Ardrossan ===
Between Kilmarnock and Irvine the route follows the trackbed of a disused railway line. The route then crosses NCR 7 near Kilwinning and follows the coast past Saltcoats to Ardrossan, including a section of promenade.

=== Ardrossan to Kintyre ===
After taking the ferry from Ardrossan to Brodick on the Isle of Arran, the route continues on the A841 north along the coast of Arran to Sannox and then climbs west to around 200m before descending to Lochranza, where a ferry runs to Claonaig on Kintyre. A 1 km section along the B8001 then links the route to the NCR78.
