= Cunninghamhead Estate =

Cunninghamhead Estate Caravan Park and Stables.
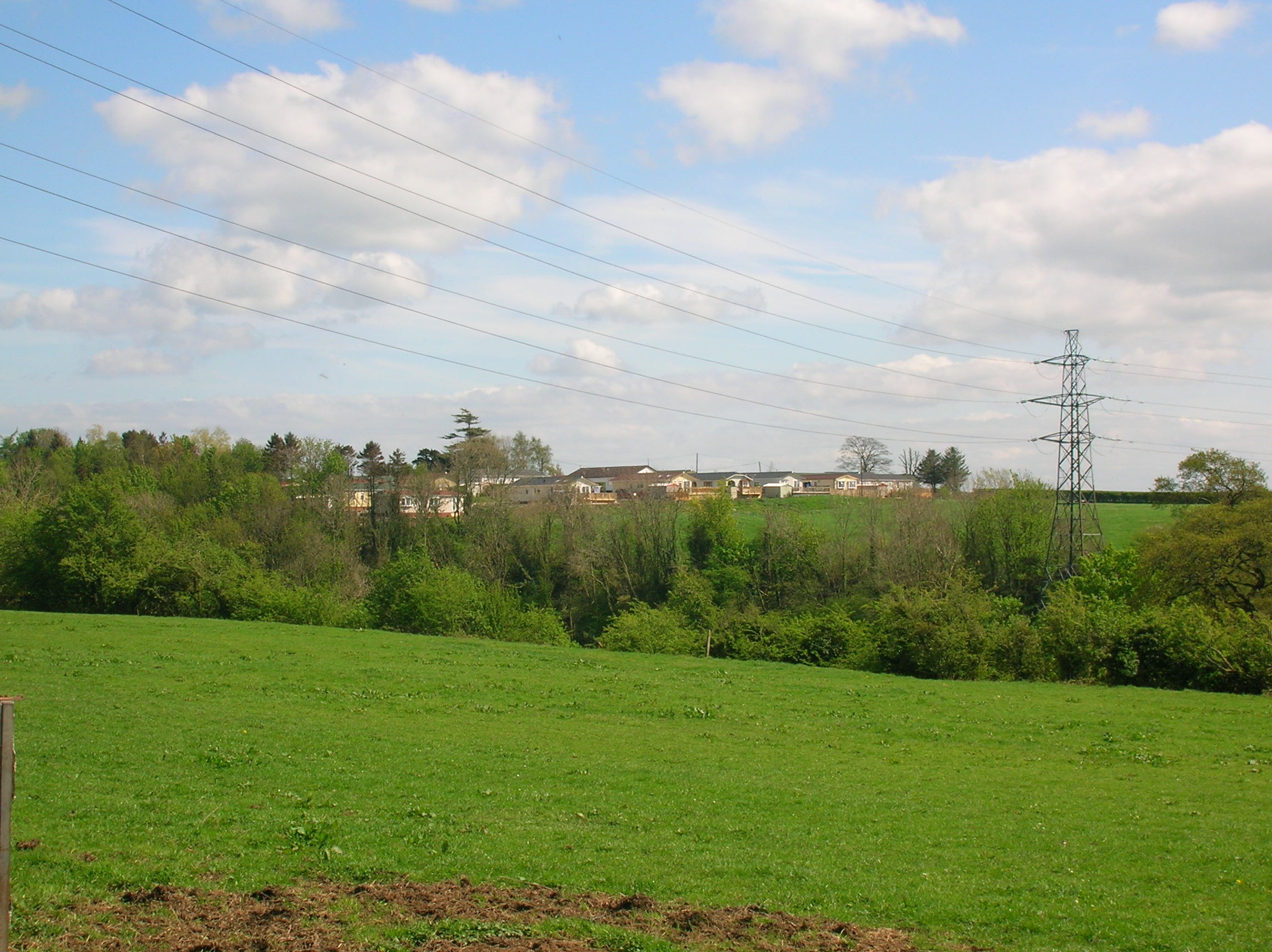
- Caravan park and housing at the site of old Cunninghamhead House.
- Interactive map of Cunninghamhead Estate Caravan Park and Stables.
- Type: Residential Park
- Location: Cunninghamhead Estate, Irvine, Scotland
- Coordinates: 55.6428°N 4.5952°W
- Area: 18 acres (7.3 ha)
- Visitors: No
- Status: Private
- Public transit: Cunninghamhead railway station

Coat of arms of the Buchanans of Cunninghamhead.

The Cunninghamhead Estate is in the 21st century mainly a residential caravan park with two private residences near Irvine, Scotland. It was once a private estate, owned by a sequence of recorded families since around 1418. The Mansion House, one of Britain's lost houses, was built in 1747; it was destroyed by fire in the early 1960s, whilst renovation work was being carried out. The old mansion and castle have been lost, however the stables are still a residence, whilst the Gardner's Cottage survive as ruins. From 1964, work was carried out, first to use the estate as a chicken farm and later as holiday and residential, caravan park and camping site, making most of the rural location. Circa 2003 the site was significantly redeveloped to become a residential caravan park exclusively for the use of retired and semi-retired persons.

== History ==
The previous name of the area was Woodhead, the name change to Cunninghamhead taking place before 1418; a charter dated 1346 from King David II to Godfrey de Ross refers to him as being 'of Coyninghamheid'. Cunninghamhead came into the Cuninghame family in the early 15th century when Robert married the Douglas heiress of that estate. From that time on, the head of the family was known as the Laird of Cunninghamhead. Gordon's map of 1654 shows 'Cuningham Head' and 'Rungham' is marked on Moll's 1745 map. Cunninghamhead Castle was a square tower, referred to as a "strong old donjon" by Pont and demolished by John Snodgrass in 1747 when a mansion house was built. The original meaning of the term 'donjon' referred to the mound or motte, not the dungeons. The estate had cost John Snodgrass Buchanan the sum of £23,309 and 2d Scots when he purchased them on 23 January 1728.

At the time of its construction Cunninghamhead House was held to be amongst the most elegant in the country, however by Robertson's time (1823) it had been altered and had lost much of its previous elegance. William Aitons's Ayrshire map of 1811 shows the new mansion and the ruins of the castle behind.

The Cunninghame family held these lands for several centuries before the Snodgrass family purchased them. In 1823 the Buchanans of Craigievairn held the estate; Mr. Snodgrass Buchanan was the owner in 1838. The Kerr's followed them in turn and the 1951 Statistical Account records the Misses Kerr as owning the estate. Middleton had been part of the estate. In around 1564 the name is given as 'Cunnygahamehead' and the laird also held Powkellie, now Pokelly, near Stewarton.

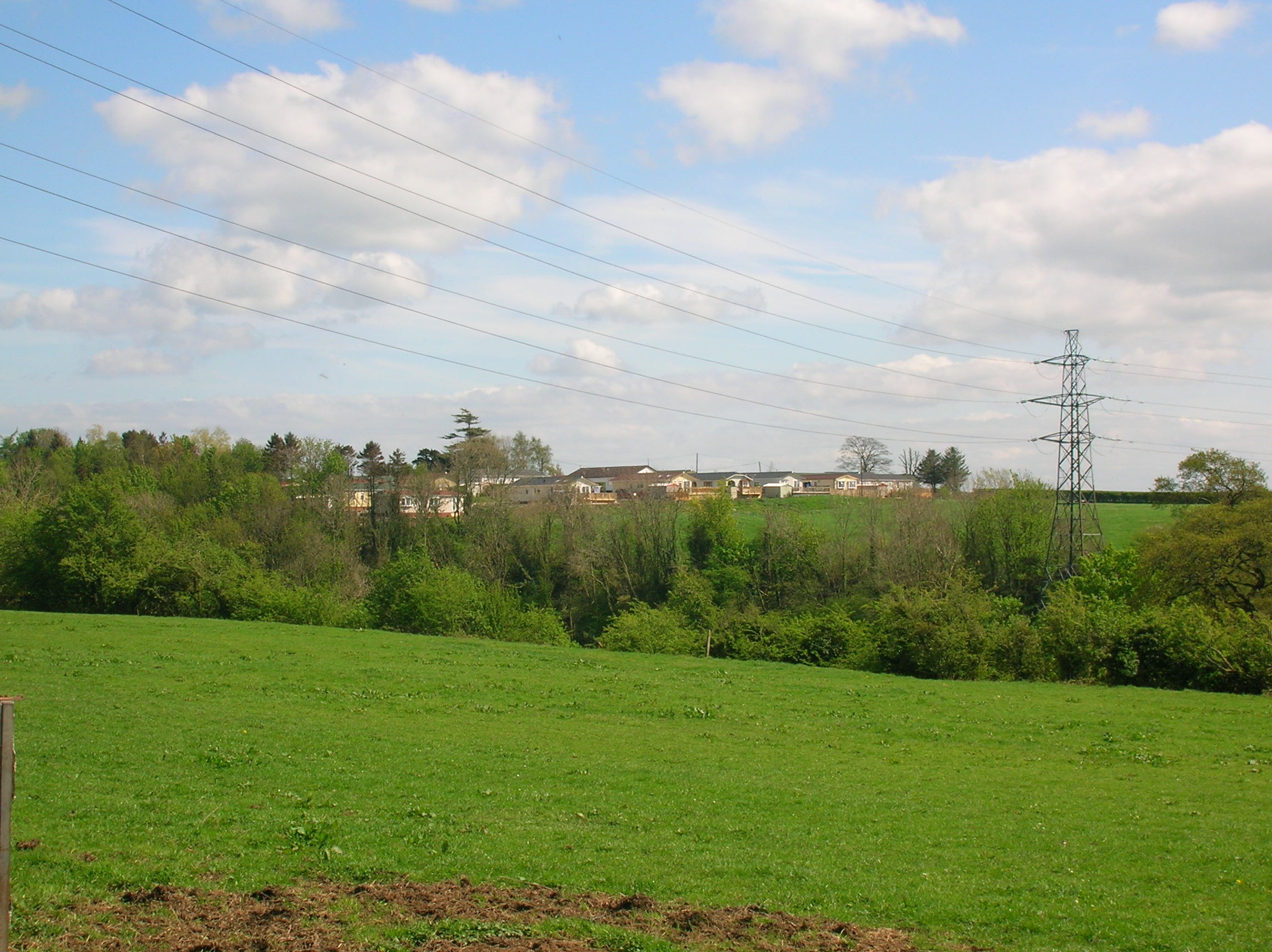
The caravan park and housing at the site of old Cunninghamhead House. 2007.

Cunninghamhead Moss was still referred to as Kinnicumheid Moss in the 18th century; an Ayrshire legend stating that the warlock Laird of Auchenskeith, near Dalry, set the Devil to build a road across Kinnicumhead Moss in a single night. This links to the original pronunciation of Cunninghame being closer to 'Kinikam'.

=== Sir William and Sir John Cunninghame ===
Of the many generations of the Cunninghame family who lived at Cunninghamehead, Sir William and his brother Sir John are recorded as pre-eminent. Sir William was present in the Great Parliament of 1560 and as a great supporter of John Knox's reforms which saw the "end of popery" in Scotland as the de facto state religion. Sir John was a member of the General Assembly in 1565 which was "so obnoxious to those of the old religion at that time".

=== The Highland Hosts ===
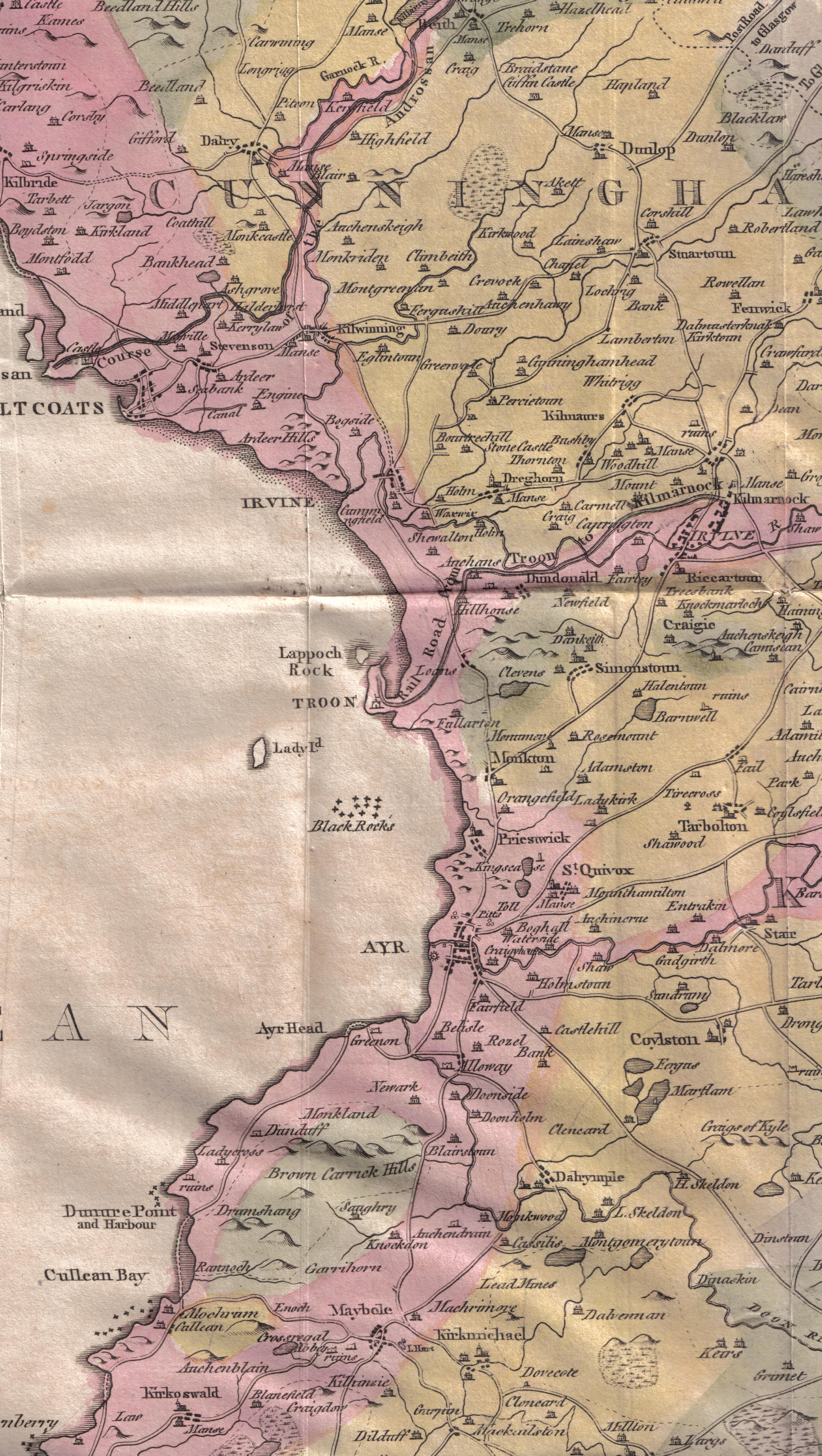
William Aiton's map of 1811.

In the 1640s Alasdair Mac Colla had been sent by Montrose to suppress support for the Covenanting cause. He plundered the Ayrshire countryside for some days and then demanded financial penalties. Sir William Cunningham's penalty for Cunninghamhead was 1,200 merks; £10,000 worth of damage already having been done.

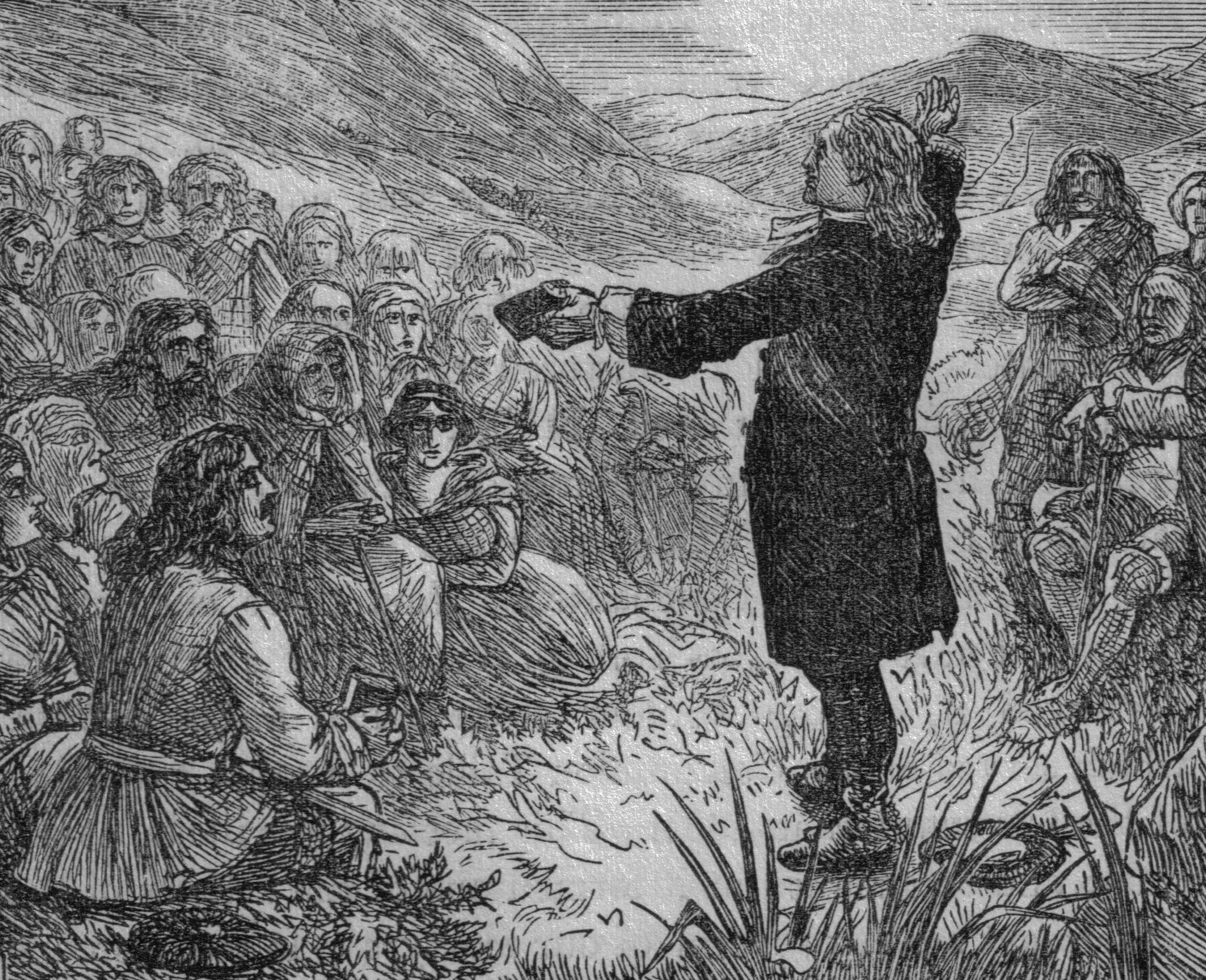
A Covenanters Conventicle.

The second 'Highland Host' episode, consisting mainly of Catholic Highlanders, was brought into Ayrshire in 1678 by the Crown Authorities to prevent the conventicles or public meetings held by the Presbyterians. At Cunninghamhead, occupied at this time by Sir William Cunninghame, Highlanders lived at 'heck and manger' for a month; what meal was in the granary they could not eat, they destroyed; they used fire to open lockfast places; and the Colonel of the troop threatened a farmer upon whom he had quartered himself that, if he did not hand over his money, he would hang him in his own barn.

Robertson relates that "They took free quarters; they robbed people on the high road; they knocked down and wounded those who complained; they stole, and wantonly destroyed, cattle; they subjected people to the torture of fire to discover to them where their money was hidden; they threatened to burn down houses if their demands were not at once complied with; besides free quarters they demanded money every day; they compelled even poor families to buy brandy and tobacco for them; they cut and wounded people from sheer devilment." The cost of all this amounted to £1,505 17s 0d. in Dreghorn and Pearceton (Sic) parish alone.

=== The Cuninghames of Towerland ===
On 19 December of the same year (1600), William Cuninghame of Towerlands (near Bourtreehill) was tried on a charge of treason, his brother, Alexander, with a party of hired soldiers, had taken violent possession of the house of Cuninghamehead, in March, 1600. The King had issued written instructions for them to leave the premises however they took up arms against the King's commissioners, upon whom they fired hagbuts. Cuninghame of Towerlands was found guilty, having assisted his brother, condemned to be beheaded at the market-cross of Edinburgh; and all his lands and goods were at the same time forfeited.

=== The residence of the Snodgrass family ===
John Snodgrass acquired the estate in 1728 and in 1747 pulled down the old tower-house and constructed the mansion. Neil Snodgrass built the stables and extended or rebuilt the mansion house. Neil Snodgrass in 1755 had been bound as apprentice to study law, however he had his sight much injured by smallpox and was compelled to return to the country and devote himself to country pursuits. He became a great friend of Alexander, Earl of Eglinton and joined him in his pursuit of practical improvements in agriculture, such as crop rotations and fallow years. In 1773 he married Marian, daughter of James McNeil Esq. of Kilmorie. They had six children.

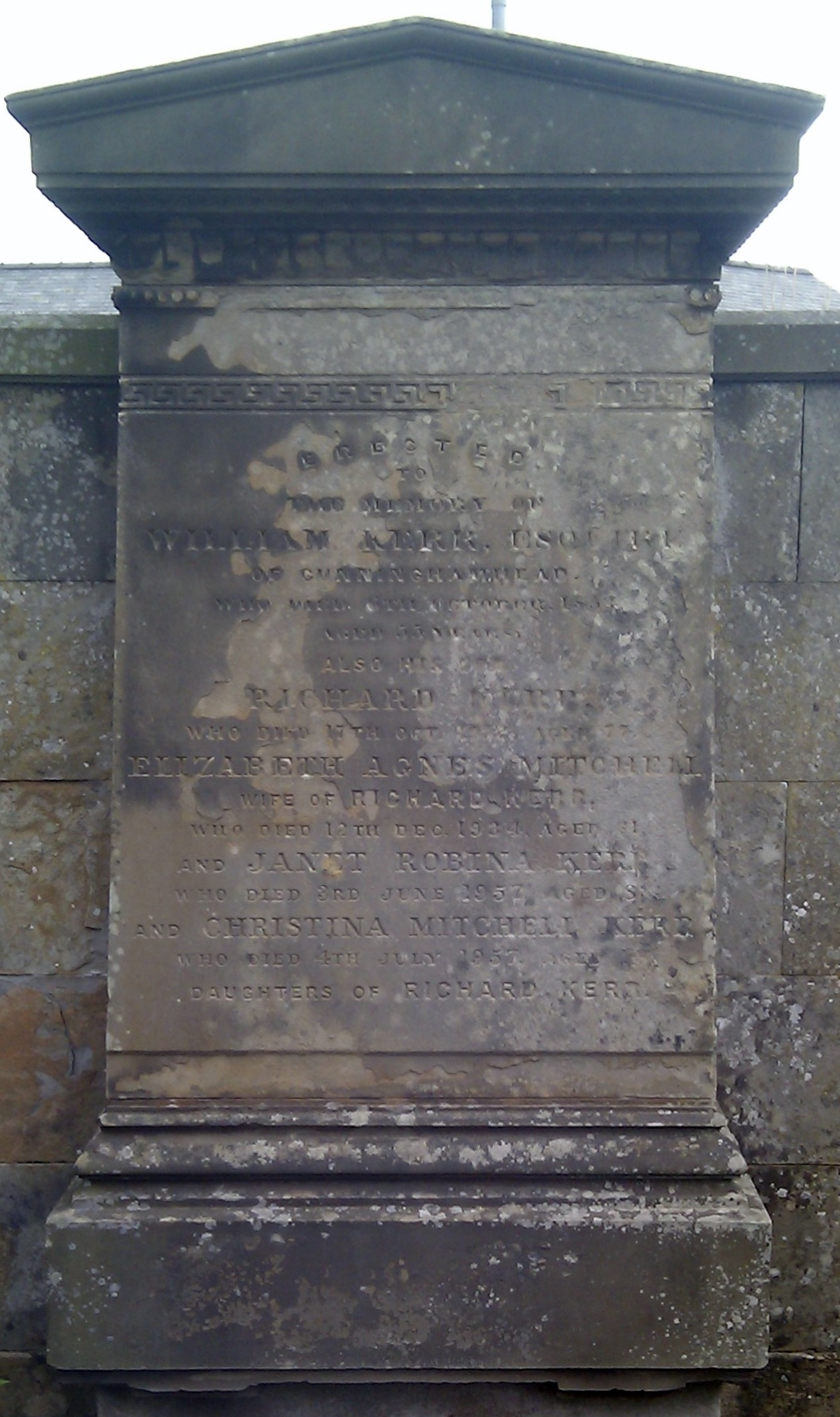
Memorial to the Kerr family at Dreghorn & Springside Parish church

Aiton complimented Mr. Snowgrass, actually Snodgrass, for his zeal in pursuing agricultural improvements in 1811, following the example set by the Earls of Eglinton and Loudoun amongst others. The arms of the Snodgrass family were a figure of justice, suspending a balance; Motto, – Discite Justinian.The Lands of Cunninghamhead were valued at £330 in 1640. William Kerr Esq of Cunninghamhead was buried in Dreghorn Parish churchyard.

Mr and Miss Buchanan of Cunninghamhead attended the famous 1839 Eglinton Tournament in what is now Eglinton Country Park and were allotted a seat in the Grand Stand.

=== The Kerr family ===
Hugh Kerr of Gatend Farm near Barrmill died on 9 August 1818 and his wife died on the 19th. Hugh had three of the sons, William, Robert and Hugh who emigrated to America and became very wealthy. William Kerr purchased Cuninghamehead, and resided here upon his retirement until his death in 1853. He was succeeded by an only child, Richard, who succeeded him.

== Today ==
=== Mansion house ===
The dilapidated mansion house was purchased by a developer after the death of the Kerr sisters and the renovations were nearly complete when vandals broke in and the building was destroyed by fire. The fire was in the early 1960s and as the house was too badly damaged for restoration it was demolished.

=== Caravan park ===
By the 1960s the estate had become significantly run down, the main entrance road impassable even by foot. From 1964, works were carried out to first use the estate as a chicken farm and later as a caravan park and camping site. From 2003 onwards significant redevelopment of the caravan park and camping site was carried out by Laird Estates Group to create a residential park exclusively for the retired and semi-retired.

This photo shows the caravan site at around 1975 where the hen huts were still erect, but before the Wigwam Bar was built. The Bungalow hasn't been extended, nor has a garage.

=== The Wigwam Bar ===
In the 1980s a major addition was made to Cunninghamhead Estate in the form of a large building for the Wigwam Bar. The bar served the caravan site and also held various functions for the local young farmers. At the turn of the millennium the bar was converted into two holiday letting units.

=== The Cottage Orné ===
An unusual building of some antiquity stands as a substantial ruin beside the river Annick Water in the holm on the southern bank. A road through the woods connects the site to the stables and to the location of the old Mansion House. This building's remains are constructed of sizeable river boulders as foundations and well worked and carved freestone or sandstone ashlar blocks. It had a large window and door facing onto the holm, whilst the wall facing the river has largely collapsed and may have had two large windows. The door has been carefully blocked and the 'holm' facing window may have been made into an entrance.

The relatively small size of the structure may suggest a social purpose, such as a type of 'Summer House' or 'Cottage orné' from the early development of the estate, circa 1747. Its last occupant was a Mackay, who was a poet or writer. Charles Mackay was editor of the Glasgow Argus for four years from 1844; he returned to London and joined the Illustrated London News. Another more obscure Charles Mackay, an actor and writer, belongs to the early 18th. century.

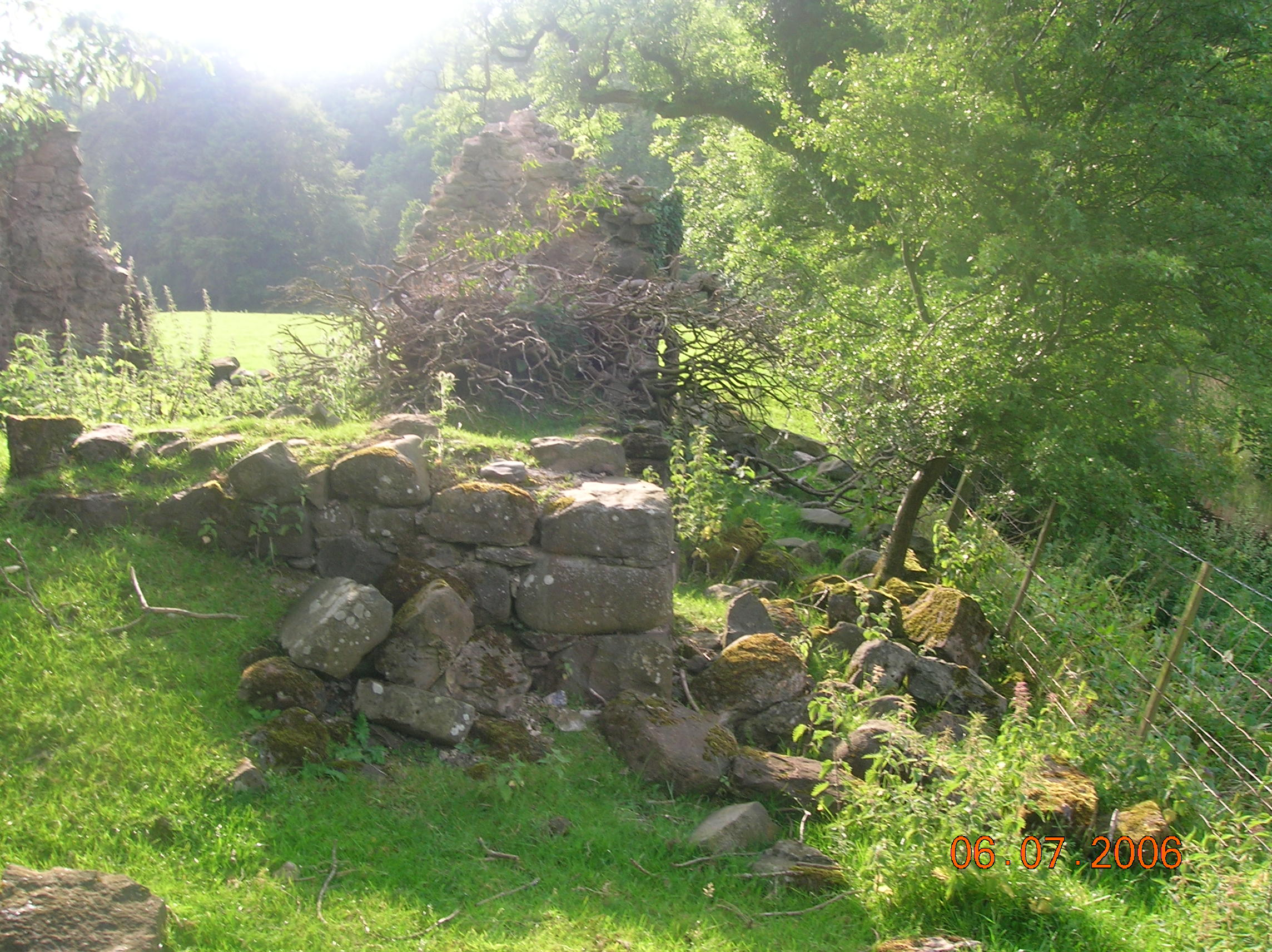
The possible 'cottage orné' beside the Annick Water showing the 'river boulders' used in its construction.

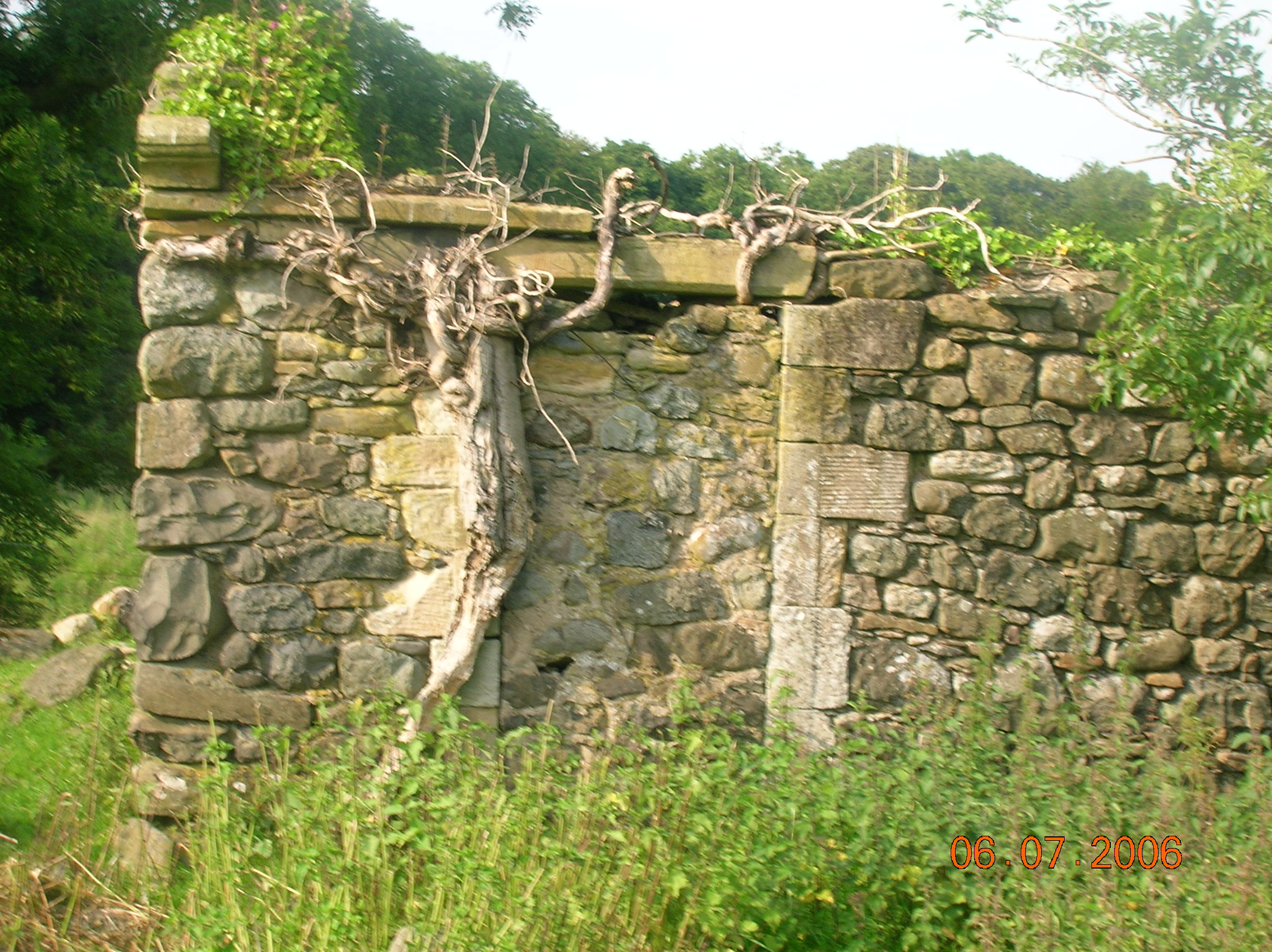
The possible 'cottage orné' beside the Annick Water, showing the high-quality ashlar stonework.

Aiton gives the following description of a building in the Eglinton Estate which may have inspired the construction of this summer house if this is what it is, saying that "Near to the gardens, in a remote corner, more than half encircled by the river, a remarkably handsome cottage has been reared, and furnished, under the direction of Lady Jean Montgomery, who has contrived to unite neatness and simplicity, with great taste, in the construction of this enchanting hut. That amiable lady, spends occasionally, some part of her leisure hours, about this delightful cottage: viewing the beauties, and contemplating the operations of nature, in the foliage of leaves, blowing of flowers, and maturation of fruits; with other rational entertainments, which her enlightened mind is capable of enjoying."Lady Jane Hamilton, the Earl's Aunt built or extended 'Lady Jane's Cottage' which lay beside the Lugton Water. She used this building to teach domestic economy to peasant girls. This may represent a later use of Lady Jane's cottage.

=== The Gardener's Cottage ===
The Gardener's Cottage lies at the bottom of the road to the river. The building was of substantial size, having been extended at least once during its history. Following persistent vandalism, it was demolished in the mid-1980s.

=== Stables ===
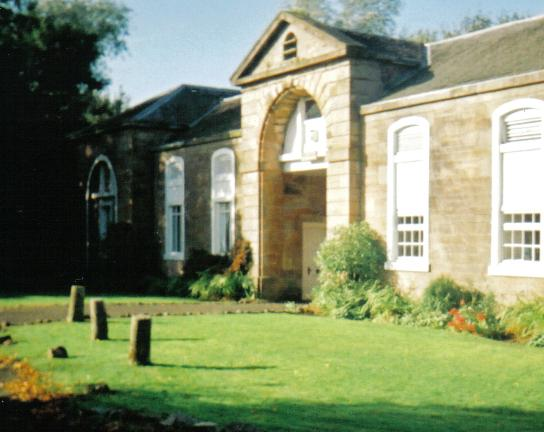
The old stables with the staddle stone bases.

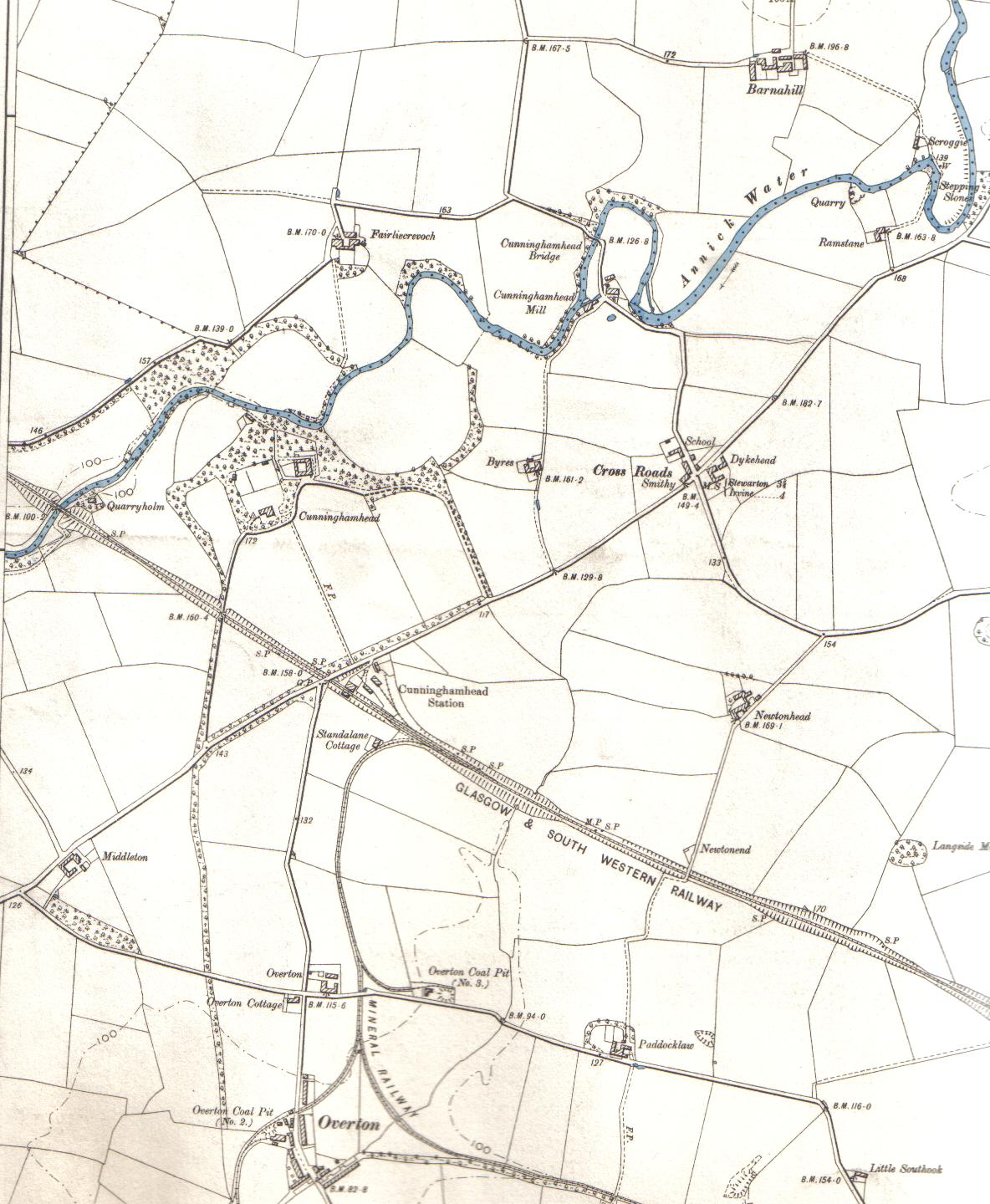
A map of the area in 1897.

The main stable building, probably once also containing the estate offices, has an impressive frontage, and dates from 1820, the remainder may date from the 1740s. A number of small workers houses were located at the bottom of the courtyard, indicated by blocked up doors. At the front of the stables are three small columns to aid the mounting of horses by their riders. These Cunninghamhead mounting stones were placed by a previous owner and are not original.

A small doocot or dovecot was above the entrance arch until its removal by the current owner. This was a feature of many estates, as the right to build a doocot was originally strictly limited to the major landowners, and only later were small freeholders permitted to build them; at a more recent date tenants could sometimes gain permission from their landlord to build doocots for the meat or to add a picturesque feature to their properties.

The stables had been actively marketed for a new owner from 2008, and in mid 2015 sold. Significant development plans have been submitted by the new owner.

The stables as they were in 1975 can be seen here: https://www.trove.scot/image/1649361 where the dovecot over the entrance is still in place. The windows to the workshop area have shutters and grates on them. The stones at the front were to assist in mounting horses.

=== Other estate structures ===
Ruins of other vernacular buildings, known as the 'Gardener's Cottage' are also to be found as total ruins in the woods off to the left hand side of the path leading down to the Annick Water from the estate. Quarry Holm, beside the old railway embankment between the estate and Annick Lodge, has the foundations of some old buildings, industrial in nature, which appear to have seen re-use before being abandoned. The railway line of 1843 cut off this site from the Annick Lodge area.

== Natural history ==
Sections of the deciduous woods on the northern side of the Annick Water from the old mansion house have a rich plant diversity, indicating that they are long established and not just plantations on previously cleared land. These woodlands contain plants such as Male Shield Fern, Lady Fern, Tuberous Comfrey, Tussock Grass, Bluebells, Dog's Mercury, Opposite-Leaved Golden Saxifrage, Woodrush, Sanicle, Enchanter's Nightshade and Wood Sorrel. Agrimony is another unusual find, growing in a riparian position on the Annick Water bank, together with wild mint, just upstream of the old railway viaduct.

Cunninghamhead Estate is the setting for much of Gerry Cambridge's The Ayrshire Nestling, a memoir of the poet's teenage years partly about discovering birds and other natural history around the area. In September 2025, the book was longlisted for Scotland's Non-Fiction Book of the Year.

== See also ==
1. Cunninghamhead
2. Lambroughton
3. Chapeltoun
4. Corsehill
5. Staddle stones
6. The History of Cunninghamhead
7. Cunninghamhead railway station
8. Auchenharvie Castle
9. Thorntoun Estate
10. Lugton – The Caldwell estate.
11. Eglinton Country Park
