= Cunninghamhead =

Coordinates: 55.643°N 4.580°W

Cunninghamhead: Scottish Gaelic: Ceann Coineagan; Scots: Cunninhamheid
- Location within North Ayrshire
- OS grid reference: NS376418
- Council area: North Ayrshire
- Lieutenancy area: Ayrshire and Arran
- Country: Scotland
- Sovereign state: United Kingdom
- Post town: KILMARNOCK
- Postcode district: KA3
- Dialling code: 01294
- Police: Scotland
- Fire: Scottish
- Ambulance: Scottish
- UK Parliament: Central Ayrshire
- Scottish Parliament: Cunninghame South

Cunninghamhead is a hamlet on the Annick Water in the Parish of Dreghorn, North Ayrshire, Scotland. The area was part of the old Cunninghamhead estate, and once contained several watermills.

== Cunninghamhead and the mills on the Annick Water ==
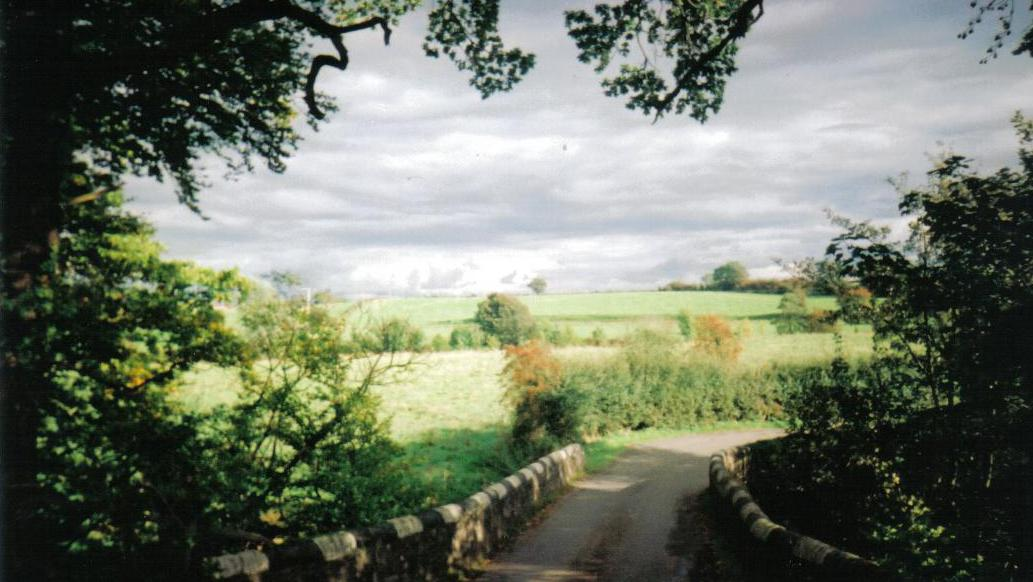
The bridge over the Annick Water at Cunninghamhead.

The area is recorded as far back as Pont's / Blaeu's map of 1654 where it is listed as Kunghamhead with a water mill situated nearby. The mill appears on Armstrong's map of 1775. This relatively large mill still exists today as a private house. One of the millers here was a cousin of the Smiths of Coldstream Mill and he taught them the milling craft (Griffith 2004). A track from the mill ran to Byres Farm and thus to the main road (Bartholomew 1912). The leat for the mill ran from a dam on the other side of the 'river loop', then behind the miller's dwelling to finally run under the road to enter the mill site. It is said locally that the dam was removed, after the closure of the mill, by the anglers, who lost salmon to poachers gaffing them as they leapt over it. The leat has been filled in. The course of the lane has changed, once running directly in front of the miller's house. The miller's house is particularly well constructed and ornamented, being owned, like the mill, by the Cunninghamhead Estate until sold after the death of the Kerr sisters.

Just across the Annick Bridge is located a dwelling called 'Tail' on Aitken's 1829 map and Roys map of 1745 - 47. The 1850s OS map shows a dwelling known as Hallgate existing in the middle of the first field on the right after crossing Cunnighamhead Bridge. The only remains are the entrance drive as well as ground depressions and hummocks on the satellite views. Tail and Hallgate appear to be in the same location. An area of well established and biodiverse woodland is present nearby, containing a very large specimen of a Black Poplar (2009), a rare tree in Ayrshire.

Evidence suggests that the name Cunninghame was originally produced as 'Kinikim' and in the 18th century Cunninghamhead Moss was still referred to as Kinnicumheid Moss. A legend is told of how the warlock Laird of Auchenskeith near Dalry set the Devil to make a road across this moss in a single night.(Service, P. 105)

Downstream from the mill was a sawmill fed from a lade which took its water from a dam built on a natural dyke across the Annick. These dykes, bands of especially hard rock, are found at several points crossing the river and many were exploited as the basis for dams, such as also occurred at Dalgarven Mill on the River Garnock. The course and position of most of these dykes is well known as they were a major consideration in the exploitation of coal. Nothing remains of the sawmill other than a vague indication of the lade and the exit onto the river. It had a right-angle turn on its lade, which is a very unusual feature. The point at which the lade changes direction may have been the site of the old mill marked on the 1832 map, but not afterwards, and the lade was then later reused for the sawmill.

A mill-wand was the rounded piece of wood acting as an axle with which several people would role a millstone form the quarry to the mill and to permit this the width of some early roads was set at a 'mill-wand breadth', giving an early conformity to the appearance of country lanes (Gauldie 1981).

== Crossroads ==
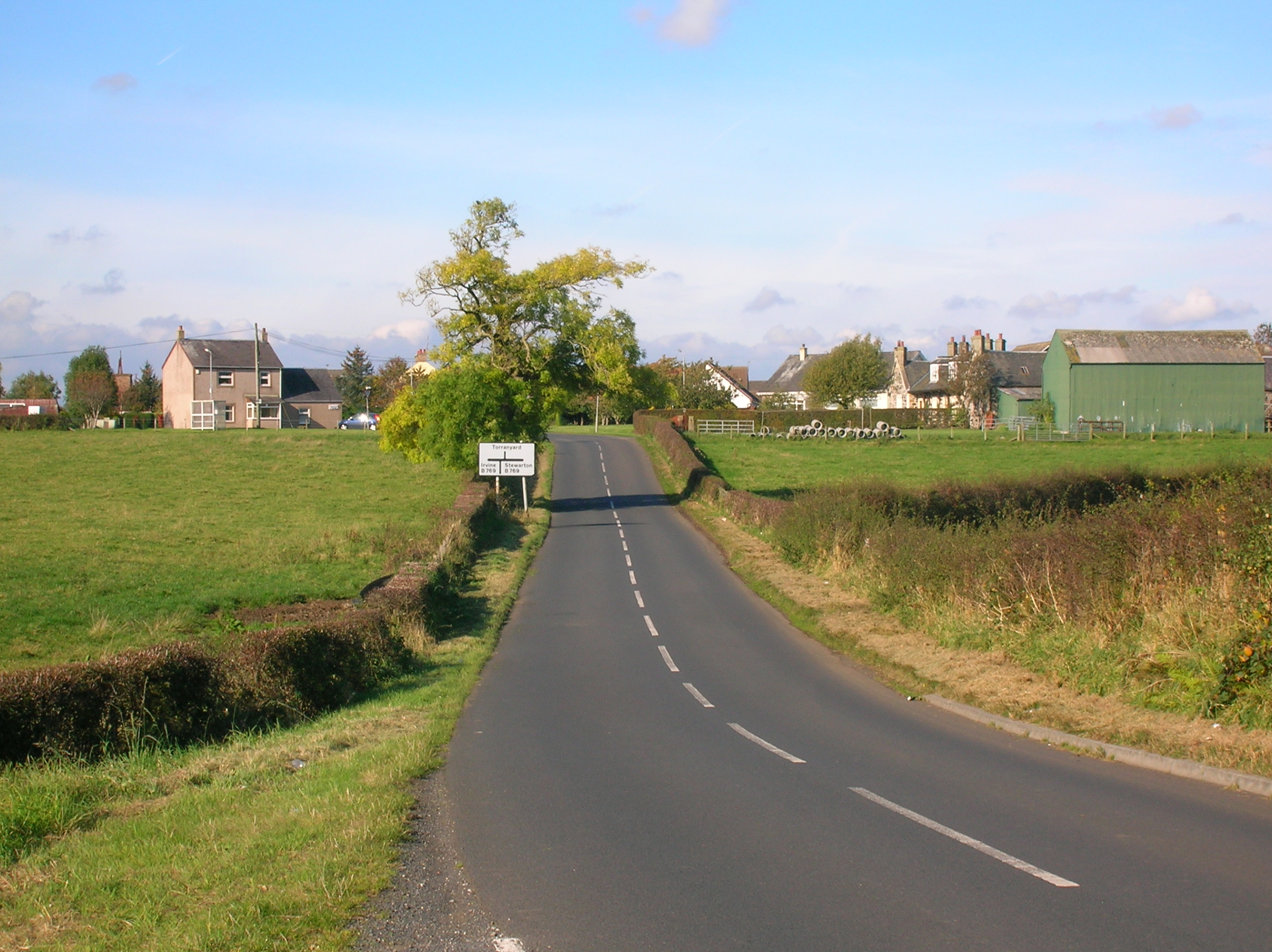
Cunninghamhead and the crossroads from the old smithy on the Kilmaurs road. 2007.

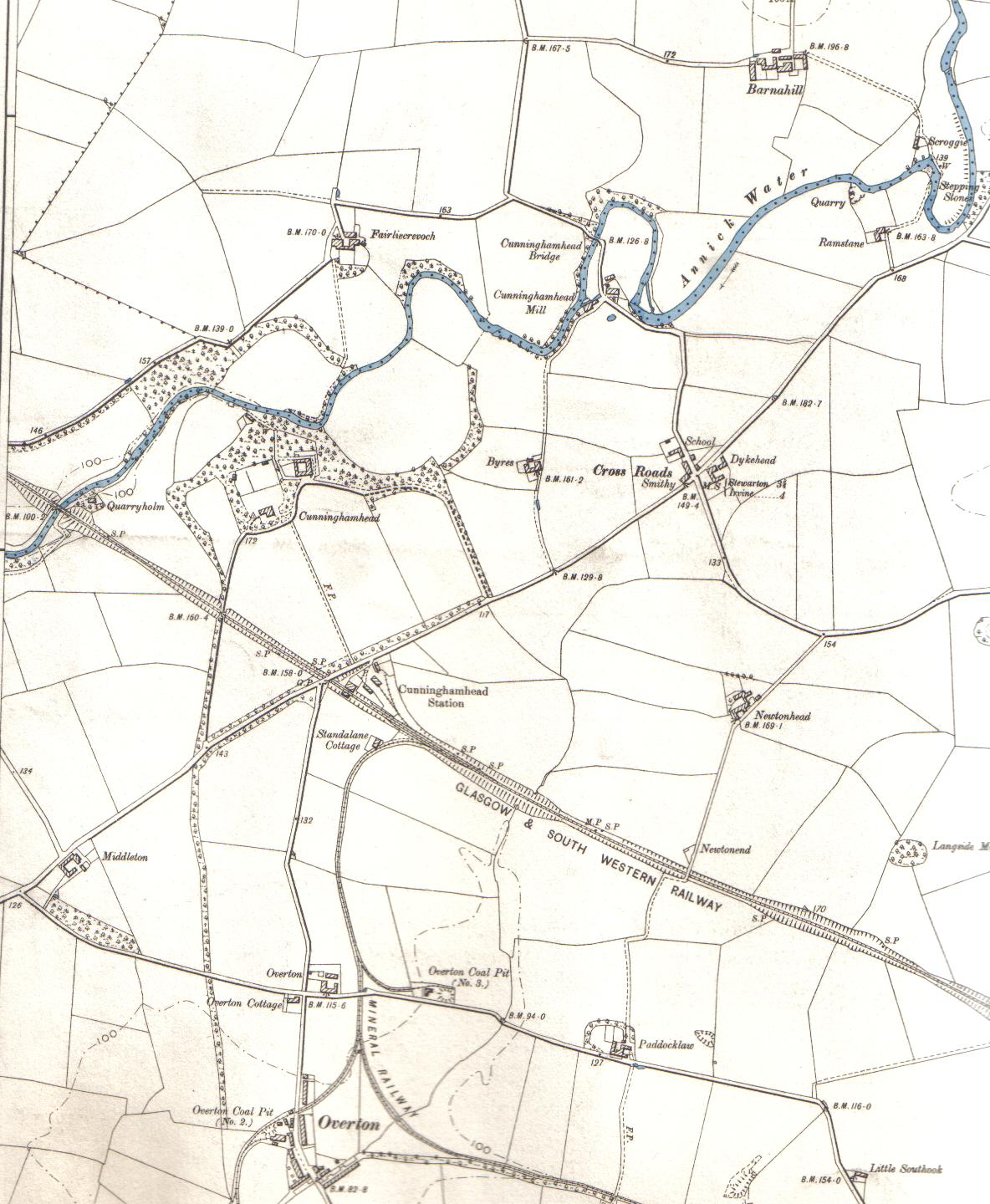
A map of the area in 1897.

The 1860 OS map shows the Crossroads hamlet to only consist of the school, toll house and Dykehead farm with a few other buildings, probably 'butt and bens' and cothouses occupied by farm and other labourers. The 1897 25 inch to the mile clearly marks 'Crossroads' in bold letters. Therefore this hamlet does seems to have been called Crossroads and the name Cunninghamhead only referred at this time to the estate and mansion. Aitken's 1829 map confirms that the name Crossroads as does Railton's of 1856, whilst the 1923 OS map seems to call the hamlet site Dykehead, which is the farm name. Dykehead may refer to a dyke or dike as has been described crossing the river relatively nearby, especially as Dykehead is marked on Pont's 1654 map at a time when very few stone hedges or dykes existed. The Wallace family were blacksmiths for several generations, living and working at Crossroads in the 19th century. They are buried at the Dreghorn parish churchyard.

The statistical report refers to the hamlet as Cunninghamhead railway station in around 1875. Dykehead Smithy was located at the bend of the road before the crossroads on the Kilmaurs road end side.

Crossroads used to actually be a 'true' cross road junction of two roads, B769 and the road to Torranyard and Kilmaurs roads. It is believed that on the grounds of safety the junction was altered to a staggered junction in about the mid 1980s it was renamed to "Cunninghamhead", which causes great confusion with Cunninghamhead Estate. The alteration of the junction to Springside just beyond the old Cunninghamhead railway station bridge was altered at around about the same time.

=== Breeking the cotte ===
A quaint method of tying up the skirt at the front in a knot or from below with string to prevent it getting dirty in the fields, called 'Breeking the Cotte', literally 'making a skirt into trousers' was a habit of women working on the farms in this parish according to Milligan and McMichael. Two methods are recorded, the first being by sewing a button on the hem in front and a loop on the hem behind, and buttoning it together between the ankles; it is usually adopted by wives. The other, which gives more scope for athletic movements, is done by raising the hem and tying it with a garter round each limb above the calf - the cotte bulging a little, like a pineapple.

== Views of Cunninghamhead in 2007 - 2008 ==
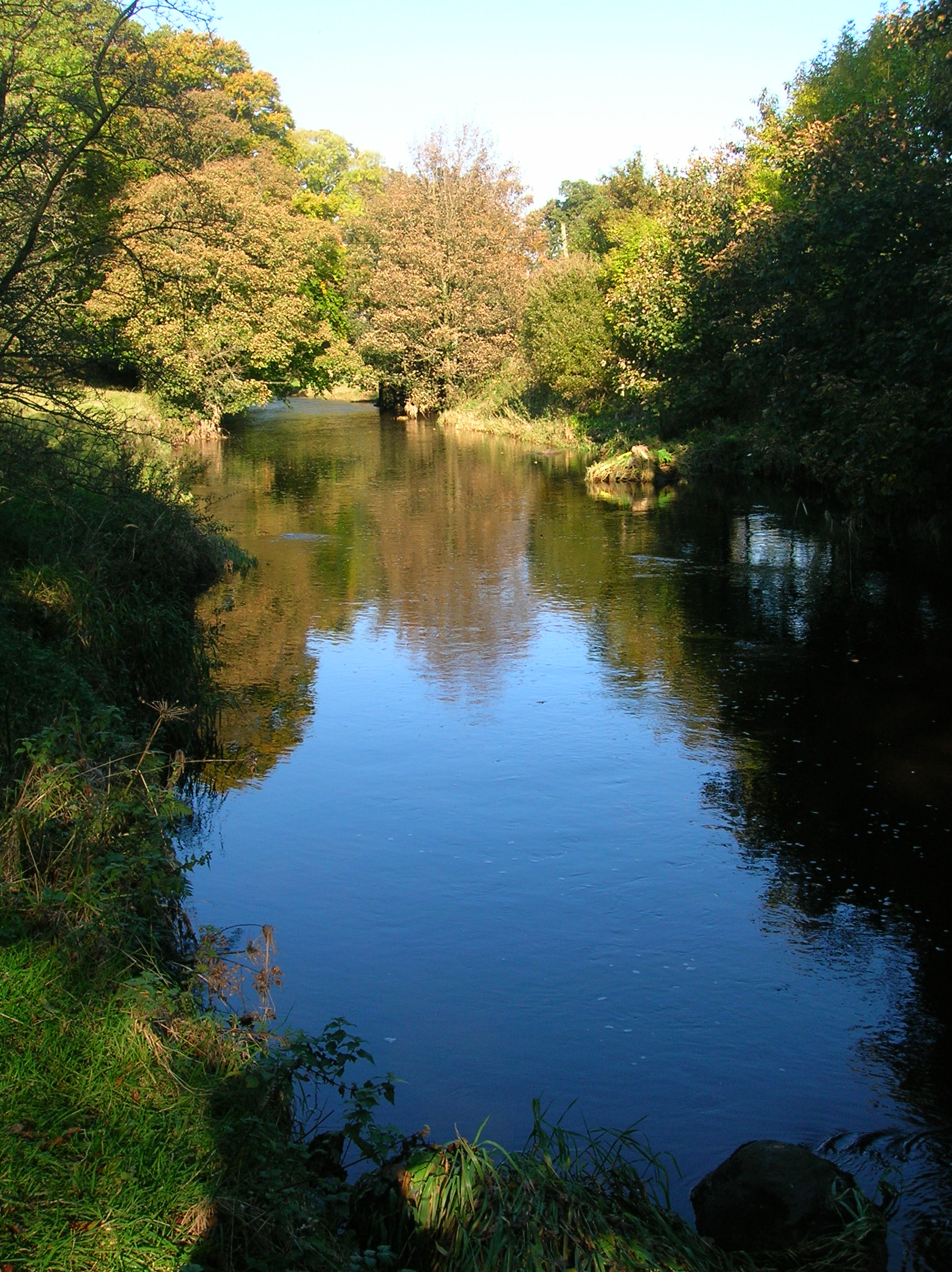
The Annick Water near Cunninghamhead mill.

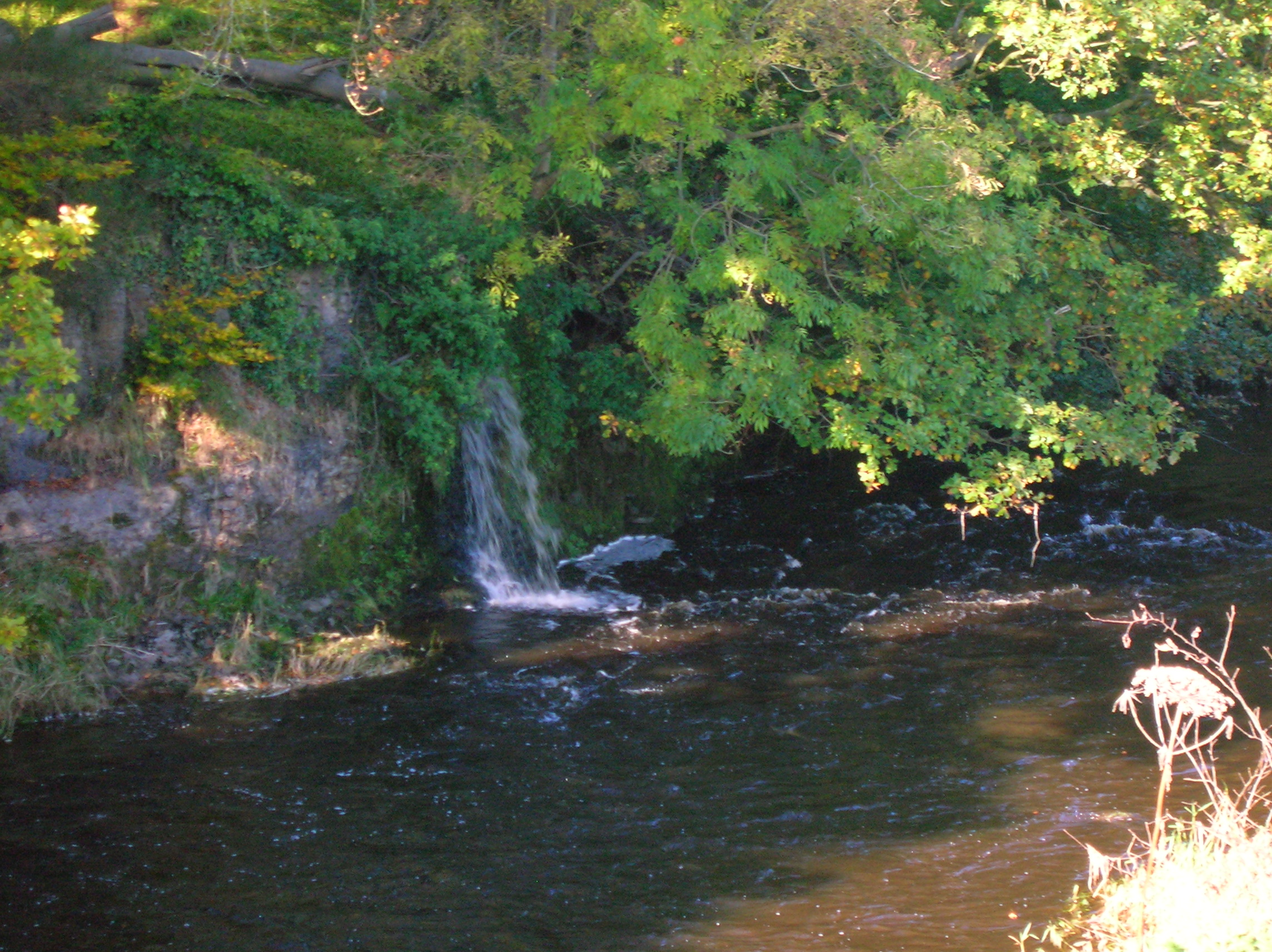
A waterfall near Cunninghamhead bridge.

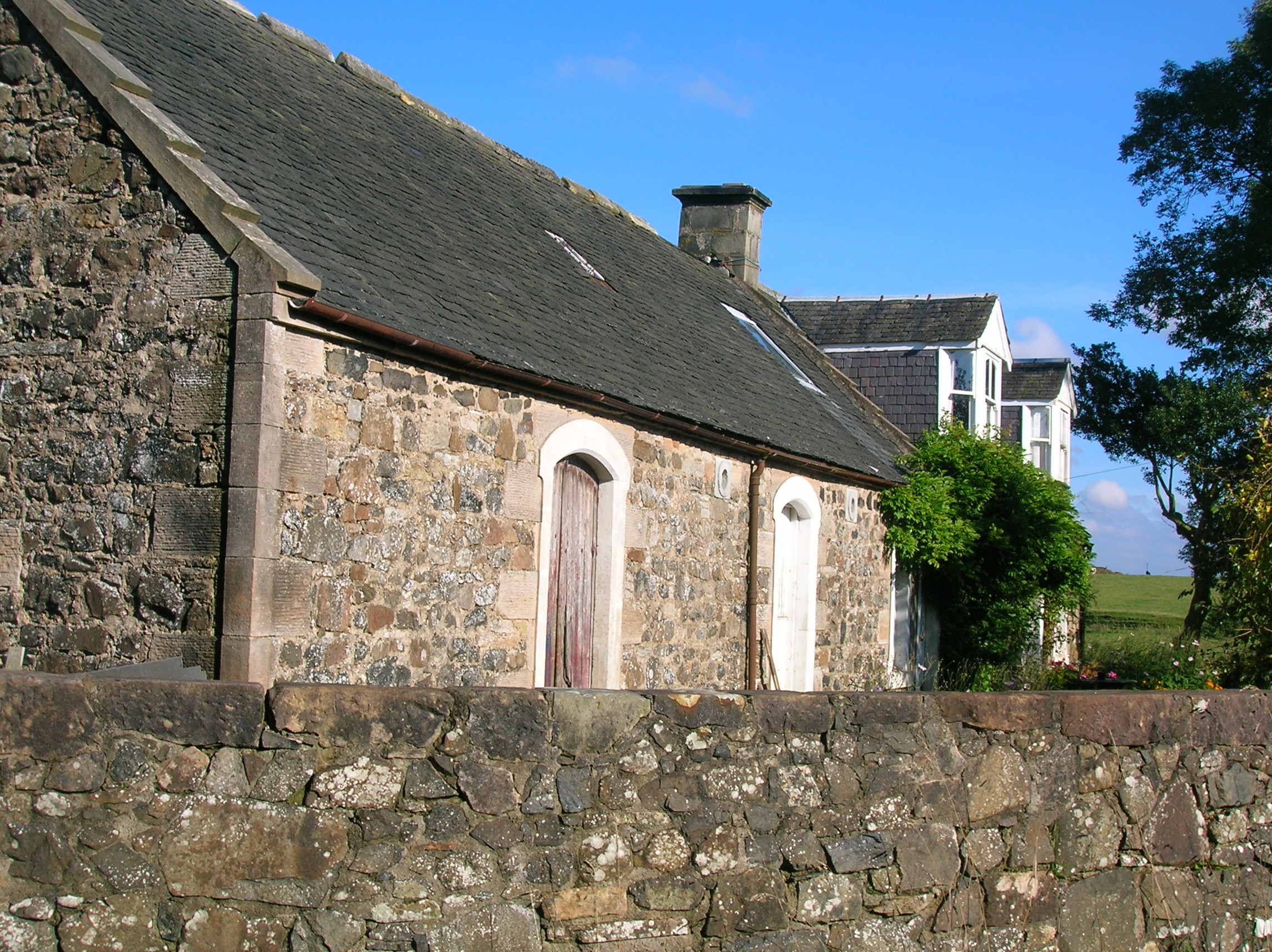
The Cunninghamhead Miller's cottage.

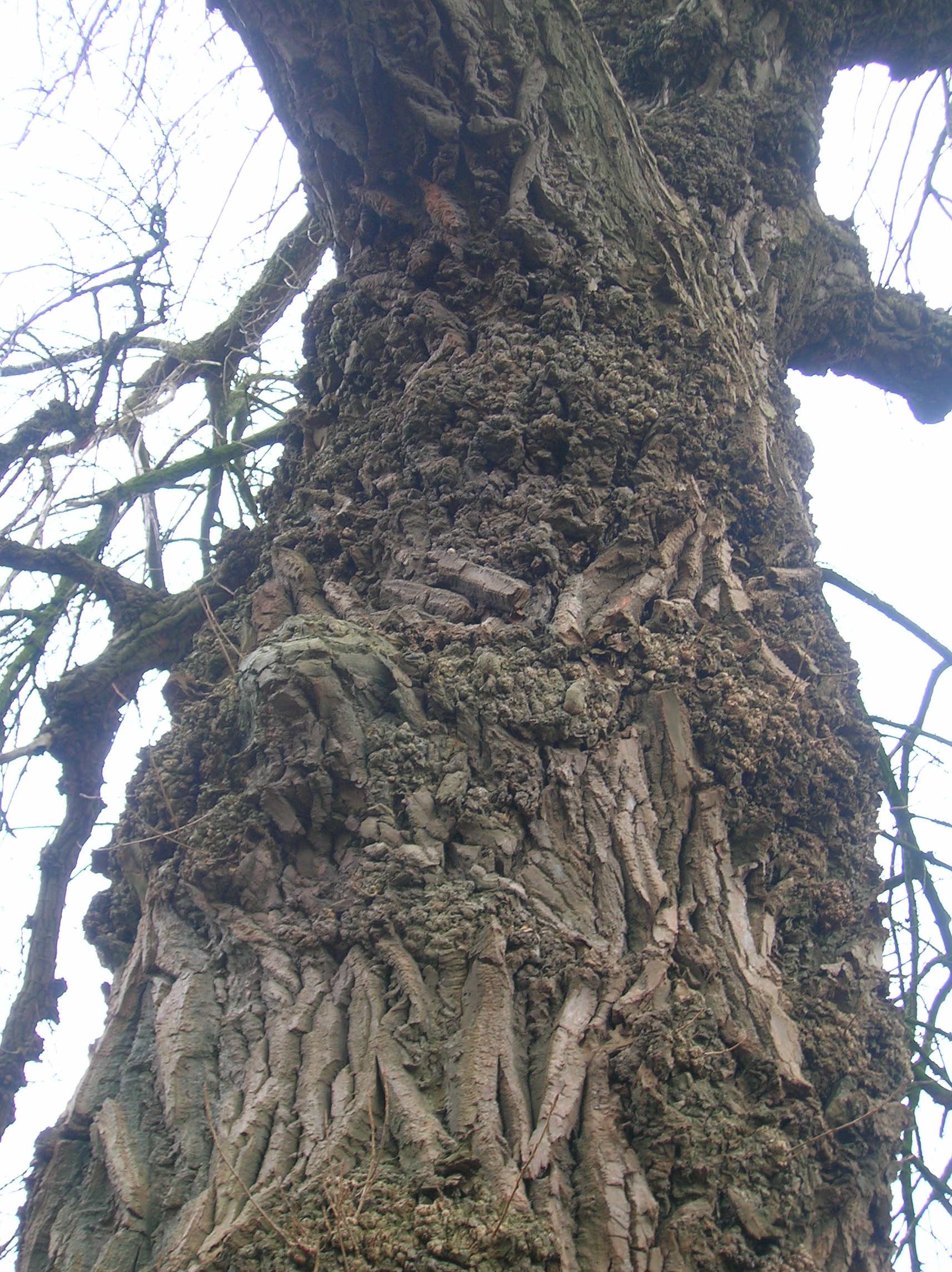
A rare Poplar tree, showing the bark and burrs.

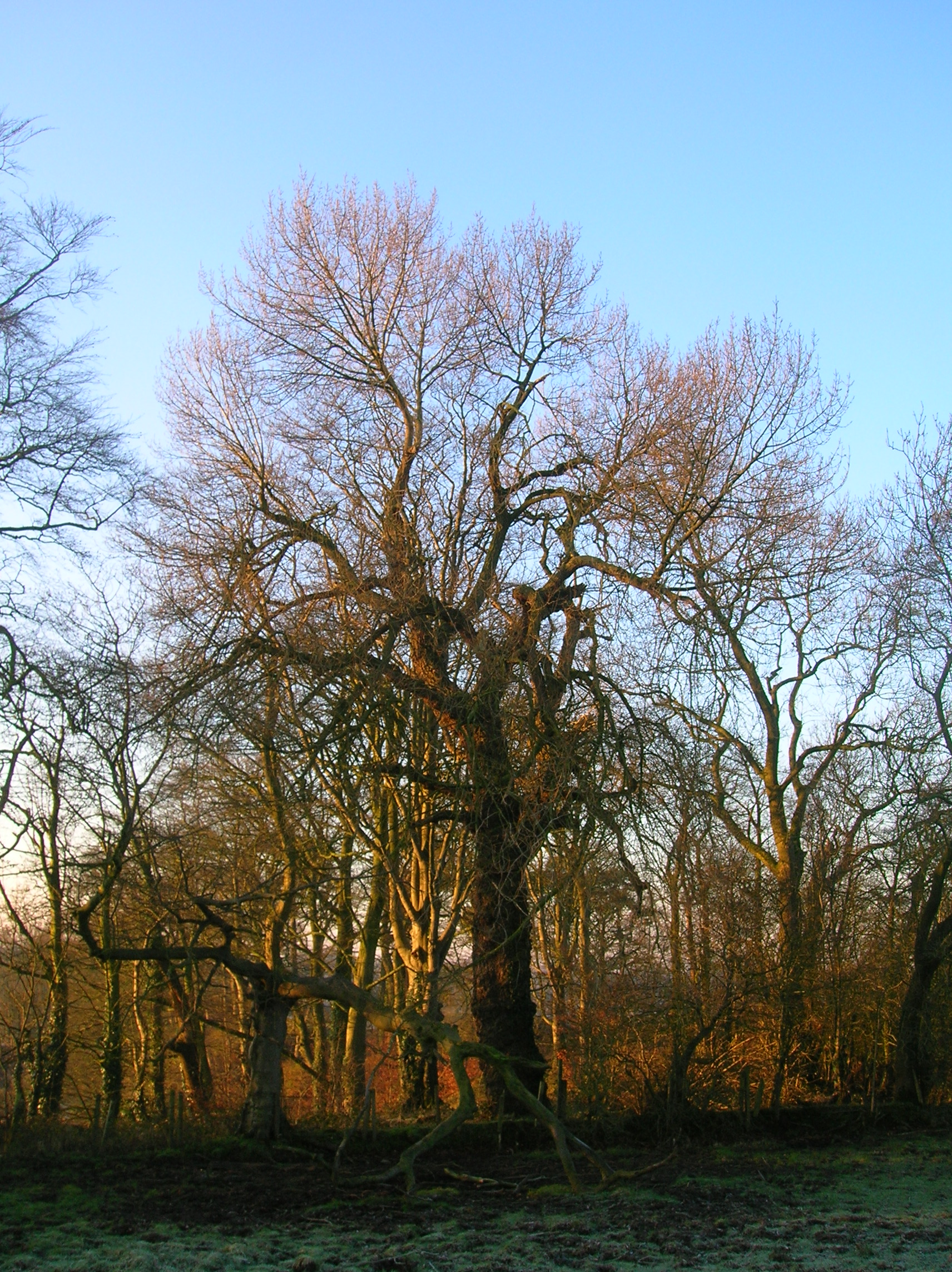
A view of the whole Poplar.

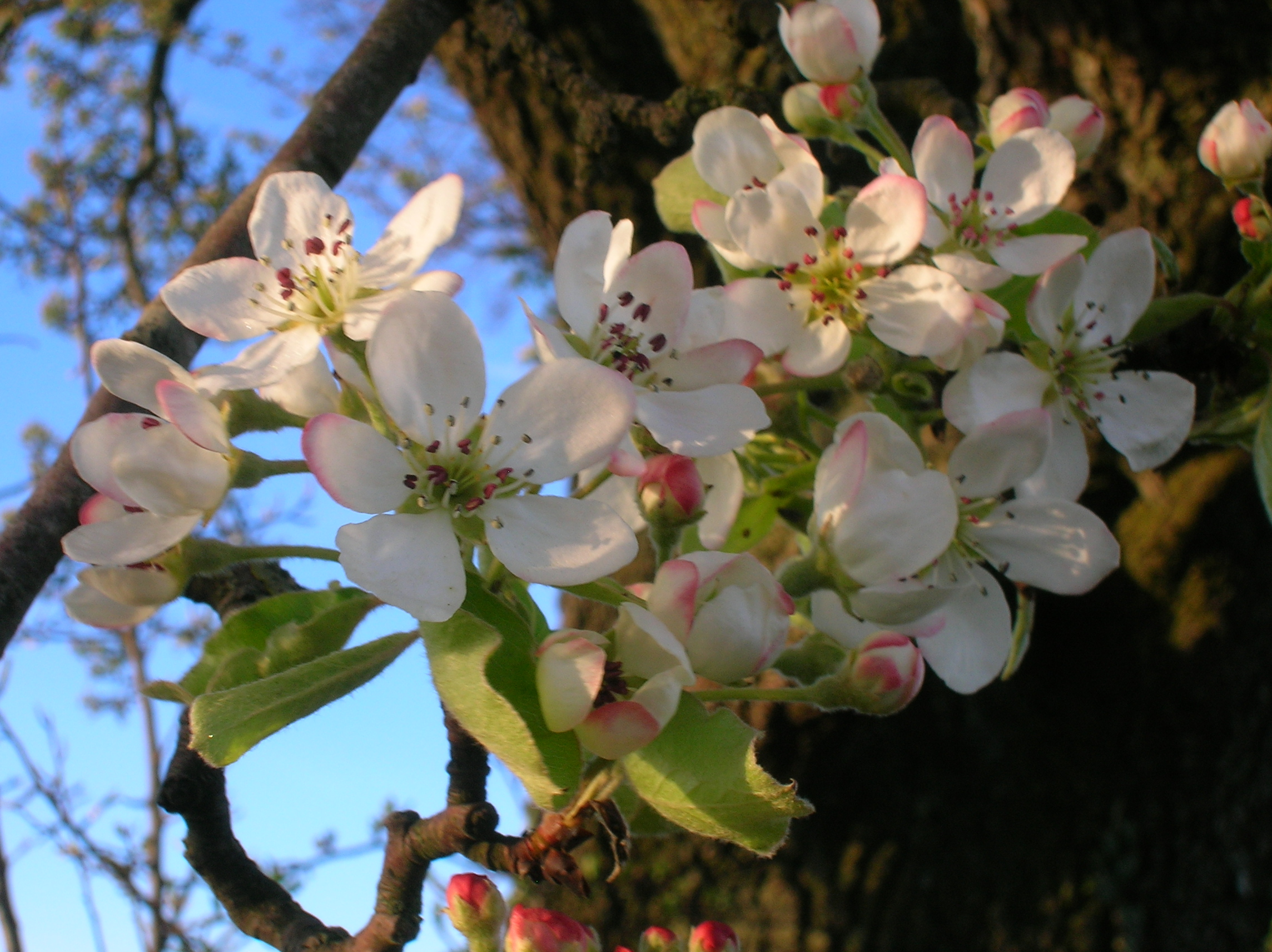
Wild Pear blossom near Cunninghamhead.

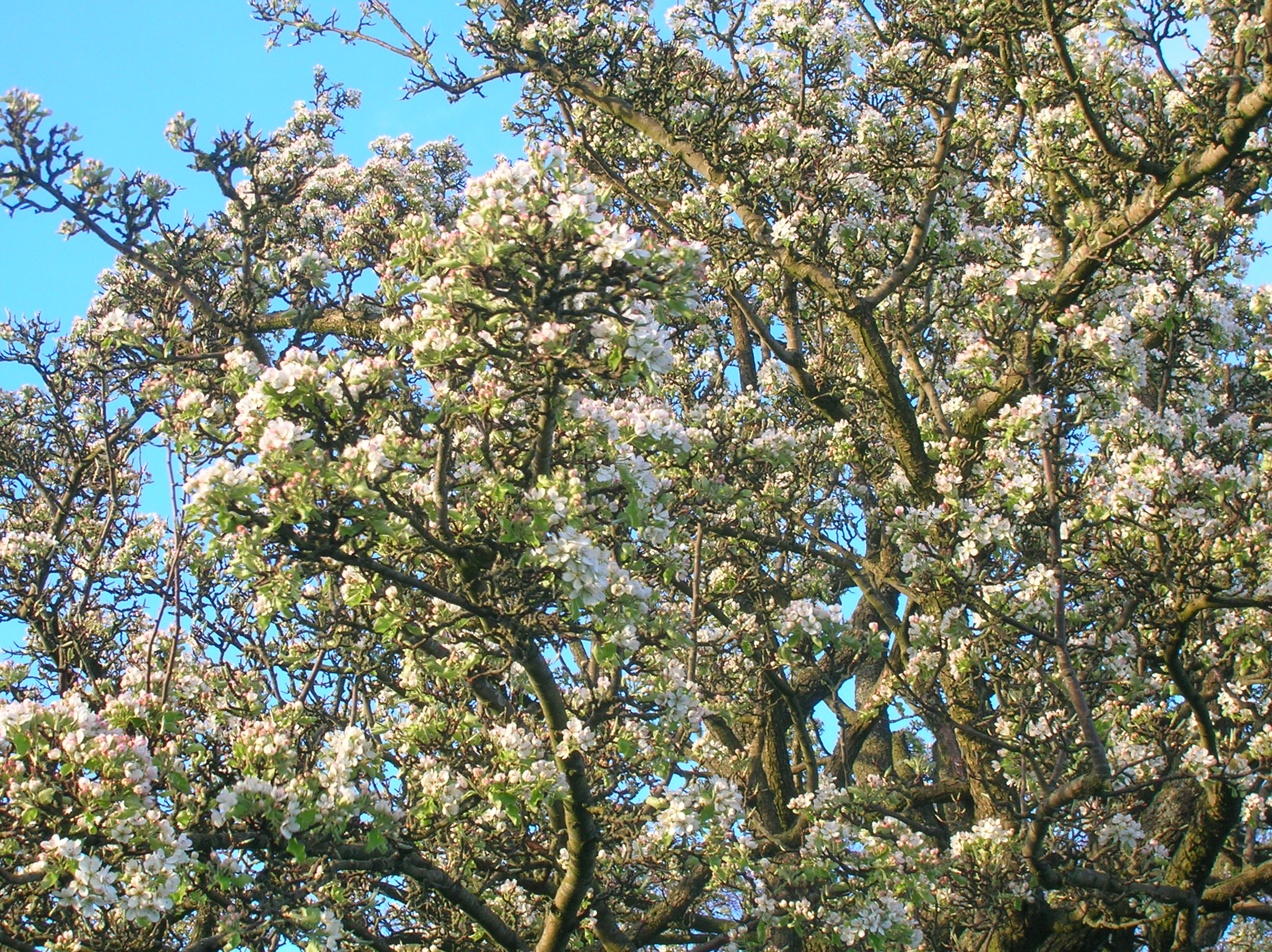
Wild Pear tree in full blossom.

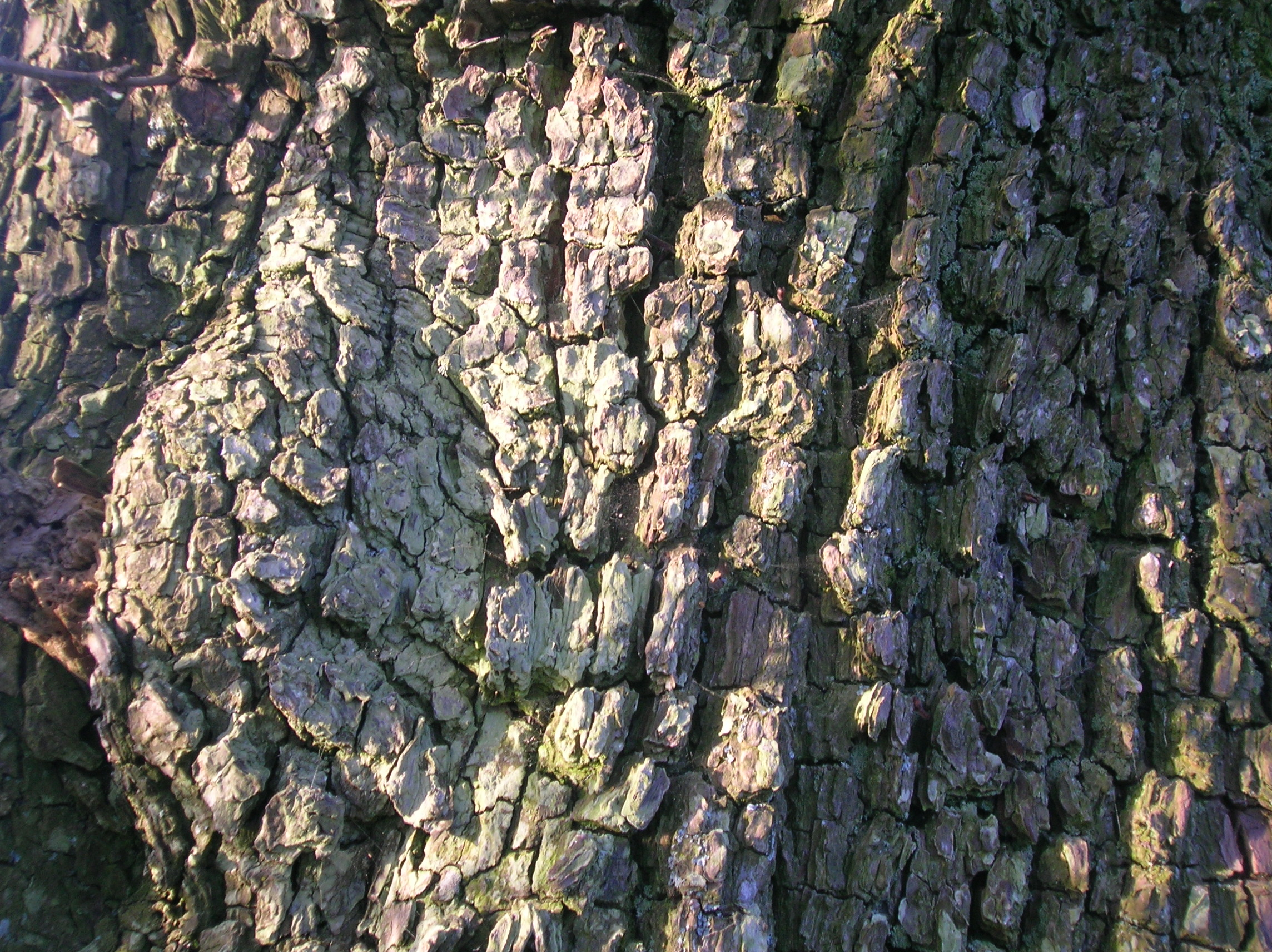
Wild Pear tree bark.

== See also ==
- Cunninghamhead Estate
- The History of Cunninghamhead
- Annick Lodge
- Perceton
- A Researcher's Guide to Local History terminology
