= Cunninghamhead railway station =

Former railway station in Scotland

Cunninghamhead
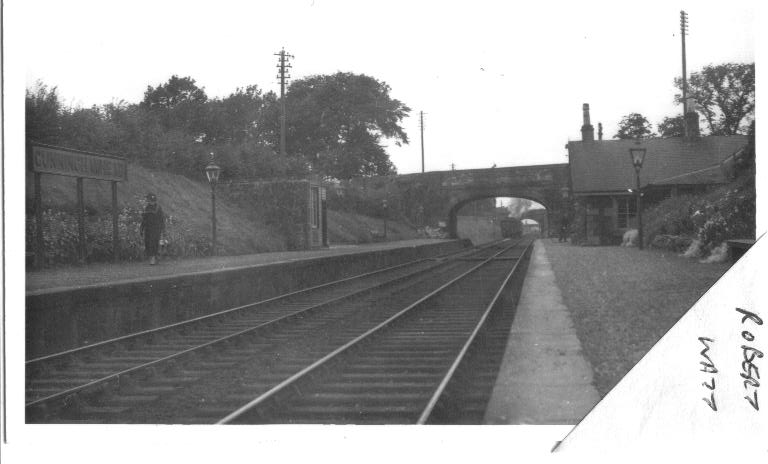
- Cunninghamhead station looking north c.1930

General information
- Location: Cunninghamhead, Ayrshire; Scotland
- Coordinates: 55.6390°N 4.5918°W
- Platforms: 2

Other information
- Status: Disused

History
- Original company: Glasgow, Paisley, Kilmarnock and Ayr Railway
- Pre-grouping: Glasgow and South Western Railway
- Post-grouping: LMS

Key dates
- 4 April 1843: Opened as Stewarton
- 22 May 1848: Closed
- November 1850: Reopened
- 1 September 1873: Renamed Cunninghamhead
- 1 January 1955: Closed
Location

Cunninghamhead railway station (NS369414) was a railway station serving Cunninghamhead Estate, the village of Crossroads (renamed to Cunninghamhead), North Ayrshire and the town of Stewarton, East Ayrshire, Scotland. The station was originally part of the Glasgow, Paisley, Kilmarnock and Ayr Railway.

== History ==
The station opened on 4 April 1843 as Stewarton, (despite being several miles away from Stewarton itself), however closed on 22 May 1848. The station reopened again in November 1850, and was eventually renamed Cunninghamhead on 1 September 1873. The station closed permanently to passengers on 1 January 1955, although the line was still in use by freight trains and diverted passenger trains until 23 October 1973. Freight services had been withdrawn in February 1960.

Preceding station	Historical railways	Following station
Crosshouse; Line and station closed	Glasgow and South Western Railway; Glasgow, Paisley, Kilmarnock and Ayr Railway	Dalry Junction (1843 - 1860); Line and station closed
Crosshouse; Line and station closed	Glasgow and South Western Railway; Glasgow, Paisley, Kilmarnock and Ayr Railway	Dalry (1860 - 1878); Line closed; station open
Crosshouse; Line and station closed	Glasgow and South Western Railway; Glasgow, Paisley, Kilmarnock and Ayr Railway	Montgreenan (1878 - 1955); Line and station closed

== Description ==
A moderately sized station building served Cunninghamhead, with two platforms and a signal box a short distance away. A rectangular sandstone shelter or store was situated on the northbound platform. Maps and photographs of Cunninghamhead show a substantial goods shed and a small weigh house with extensive cattle docks and other sidings. A Stationmaster's house was also present. The 1860 map records the electric telegraph belonging to the railway, this being a novelty in those days. A single running line and some sidings were all that remained here at closure.

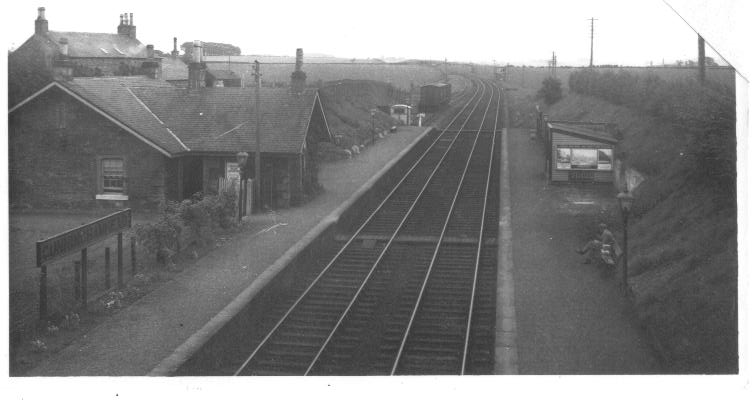
The station looking south-east c.1930

Very little remains today of the station site apart from the substantial cattle docks, parts of the station garden and the remains of a signal box. The nearby viaduct over the Annick Water is in excellent condition having been restored in 2005 / 2006. A footpath had run down from Cunninghamhead House to the station, reaching the road via an embankment in the field and passing through the fine sandstone wall which runs down from the bridge. The footpath 'gap' was closed in 2006 when this wall was rebuilt. Locals living at Cunninghamhead and Byres Farm relate that the station was known locally as 'Kerr's Halt' in the 1940s as the two Kerr family sisters from the Cunninghamhead Estate used this station frequently.

== Additional information ==
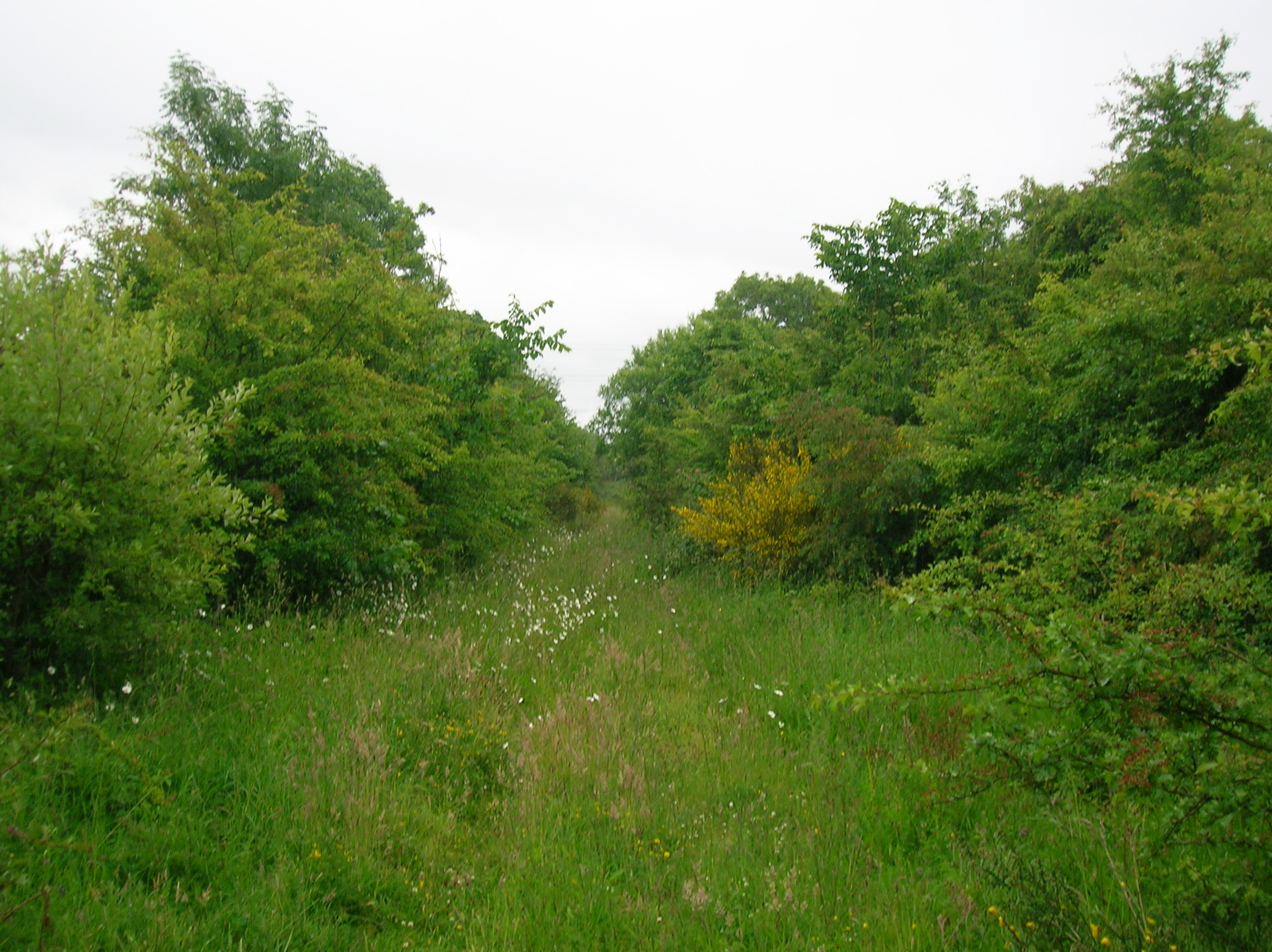
The trackbed in 2008, looking towards Cunninghamhead from near the old Annick Lodge coal siding.

Many of the Ayrshire or Cunninghame breed of cattle were sent from here to all parts of the United Kingdom and the British Empire beyond. The Ayrshire cattle breed were even sent from nearby Wheatrig Farm to restock the Falkland Islands after the war with Argentina. A tragic accident is recorded in which an Elizabeth Kennedy lost both arms when she fell beneath a train here at sometime around 1885 to 1900. A dedicated horse-drawn carriage service operated to carry passengers from Stewarton to the station for a number of years.

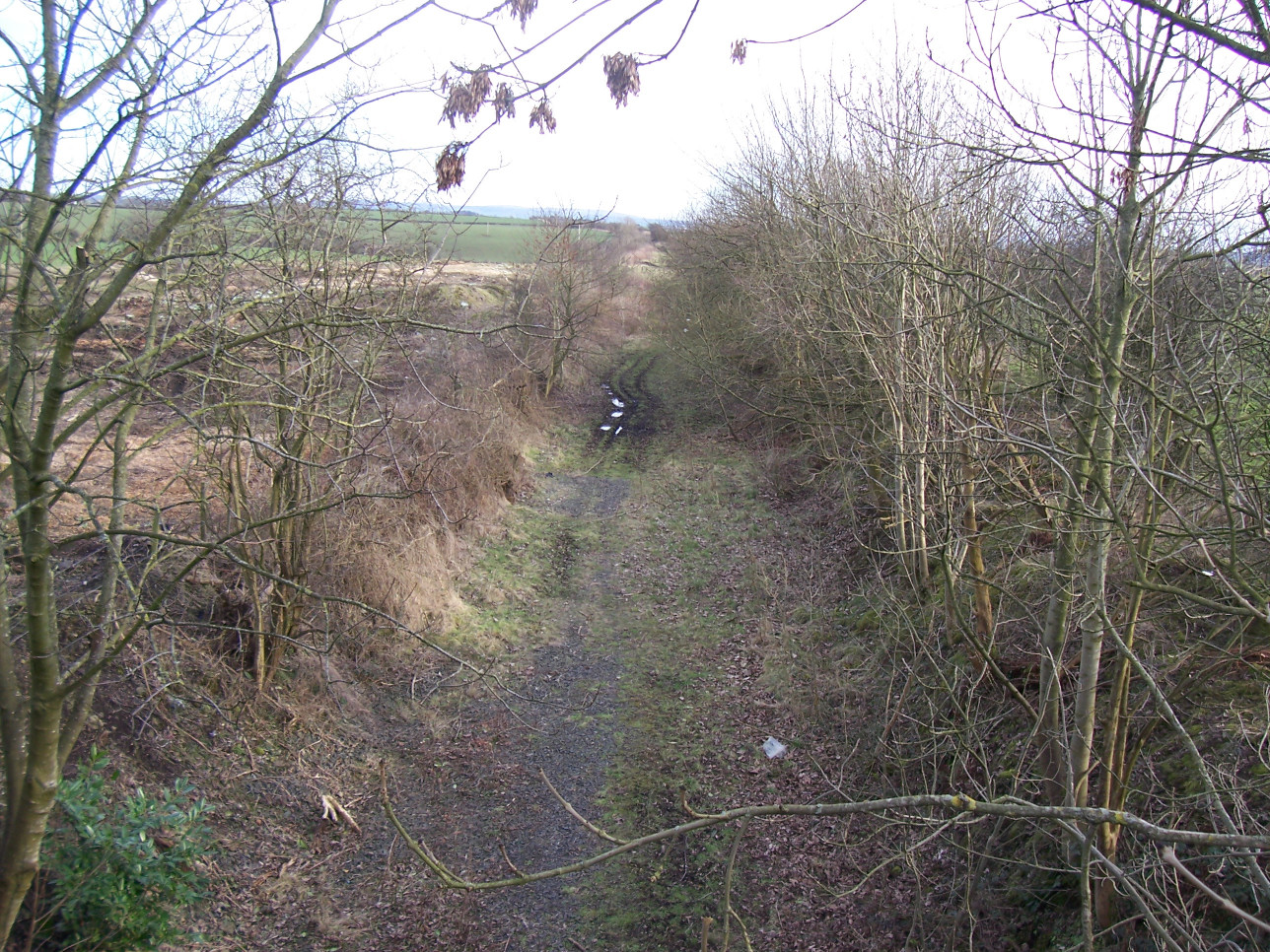
The station site looking south-east towards Busbie Junction and Kilmarnock in 2007

A mineral line running from near the station passed Overtoun Farm and running towards Southhook and Springside is shown in 1895, but is not present in the 1912 OS. Overton Row is marked on the 1912 OS with a school, coal; pit, clayworks and a number of other buildings, but by 1928 only the school building remained, only the foundation being visible today (2007). A short siding, seemingly to supply domestic coal to the Annick Lodge Estate, is indicated in 1860, but this was not marked in 1912 or subsequently.

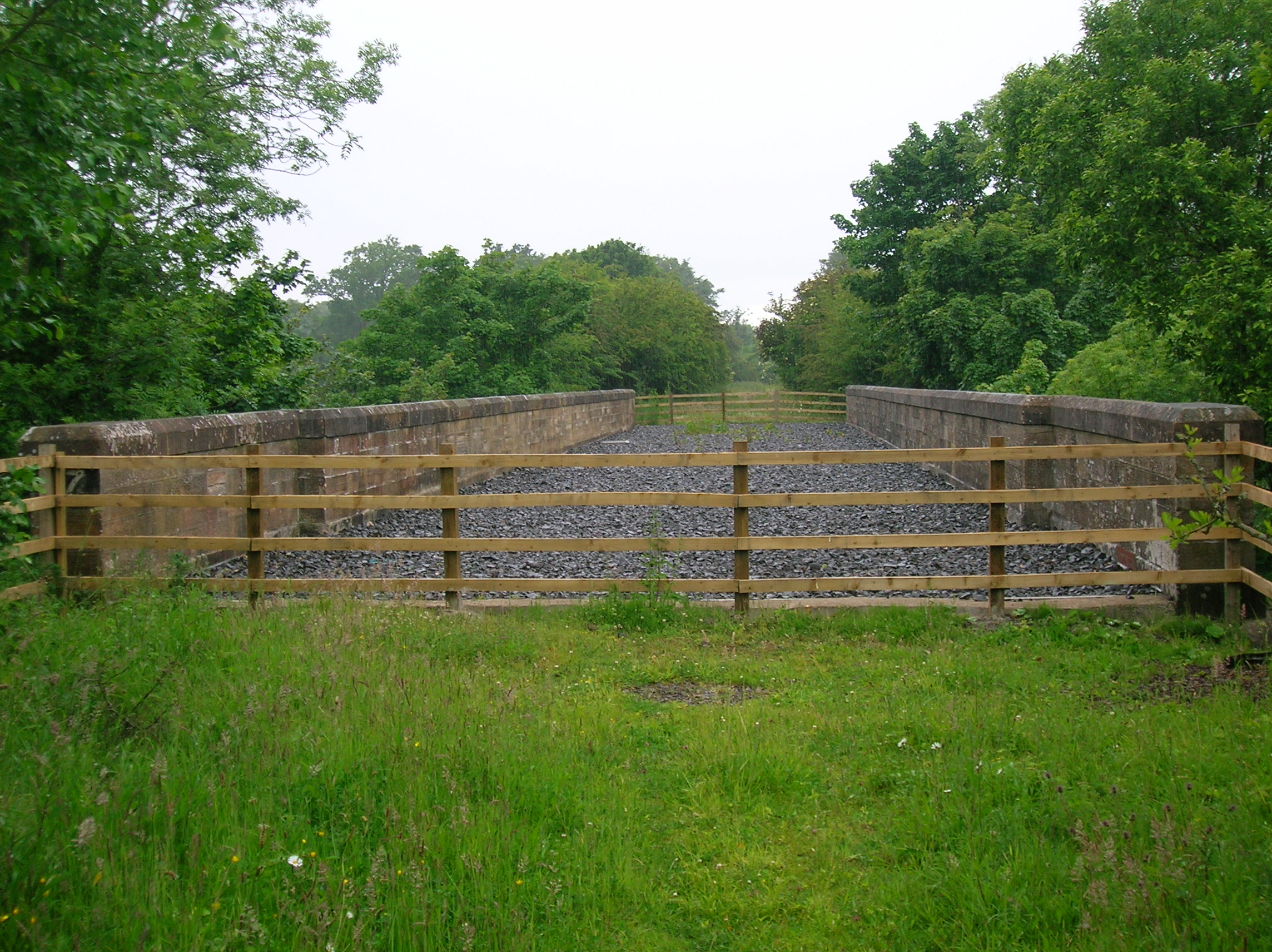
The Annick Viaduct trackbed in 2008, looking towards Montgreenan station.

Above the station in 1860 was a cottage, called Standalane, lying on the left hand side of the old road to Springside, which is now closed, as a new road has been made closer to Irvine for traffic safety reasons. Standalane's position in 1897 is shown as being almost on the mineral line; The OS maps after this date do not show it at all. In 1776, plate 45 of G. Taylor and A. Skinner's 'Survey and maps of the roads of North Britain or Scotland' shows 'Standalone' marked, so the dwelling was of some significant antiquity. The old sandstone parapet of the bridge overlooking the site of Cunninghamhead railway station has many naive carvings on it, made over the years by local children and pupils from the local school as they waited and watched the old steam and diesel trains going by.

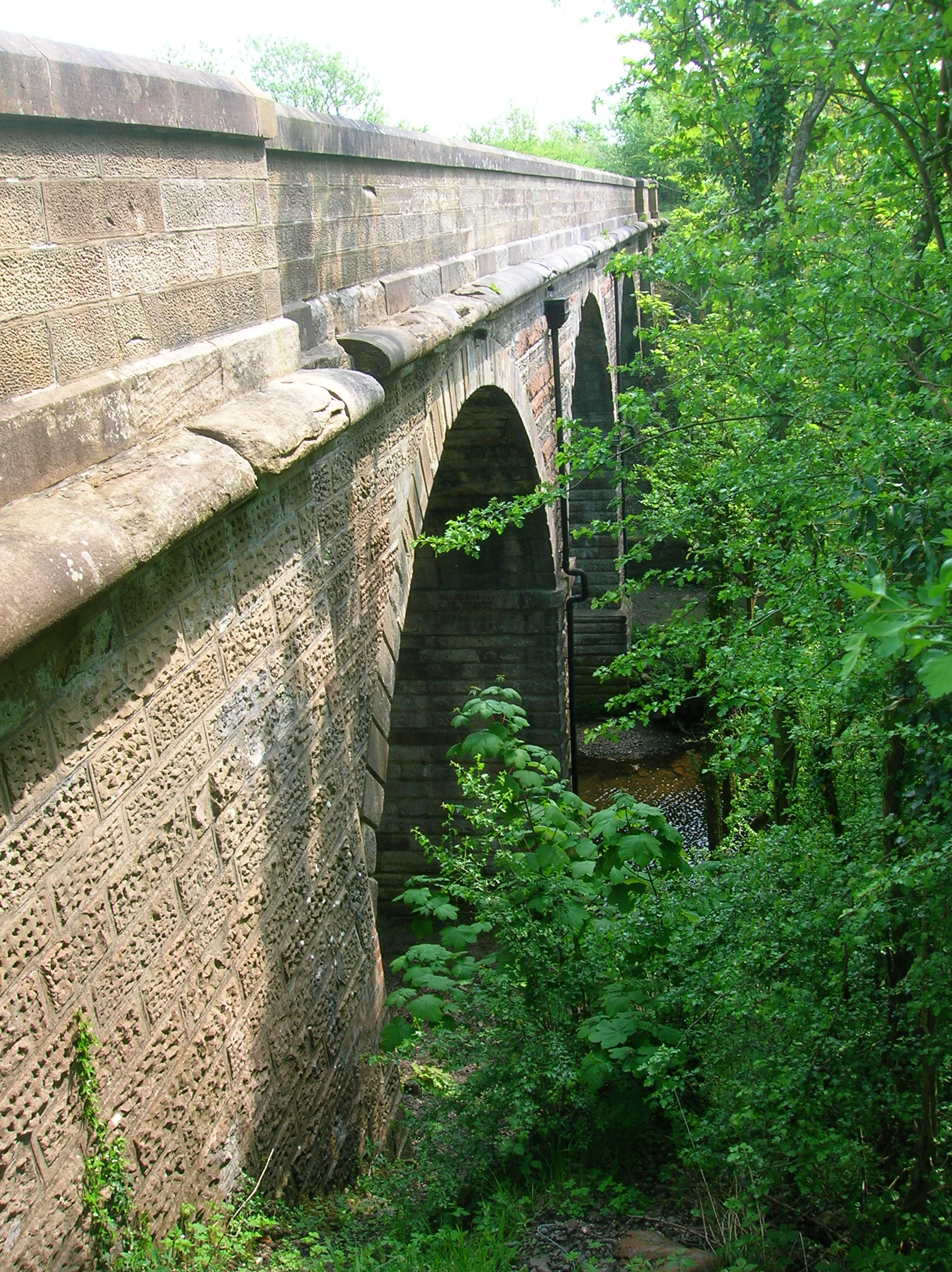
Detail of the disused, but restored, Annick Viaduct.

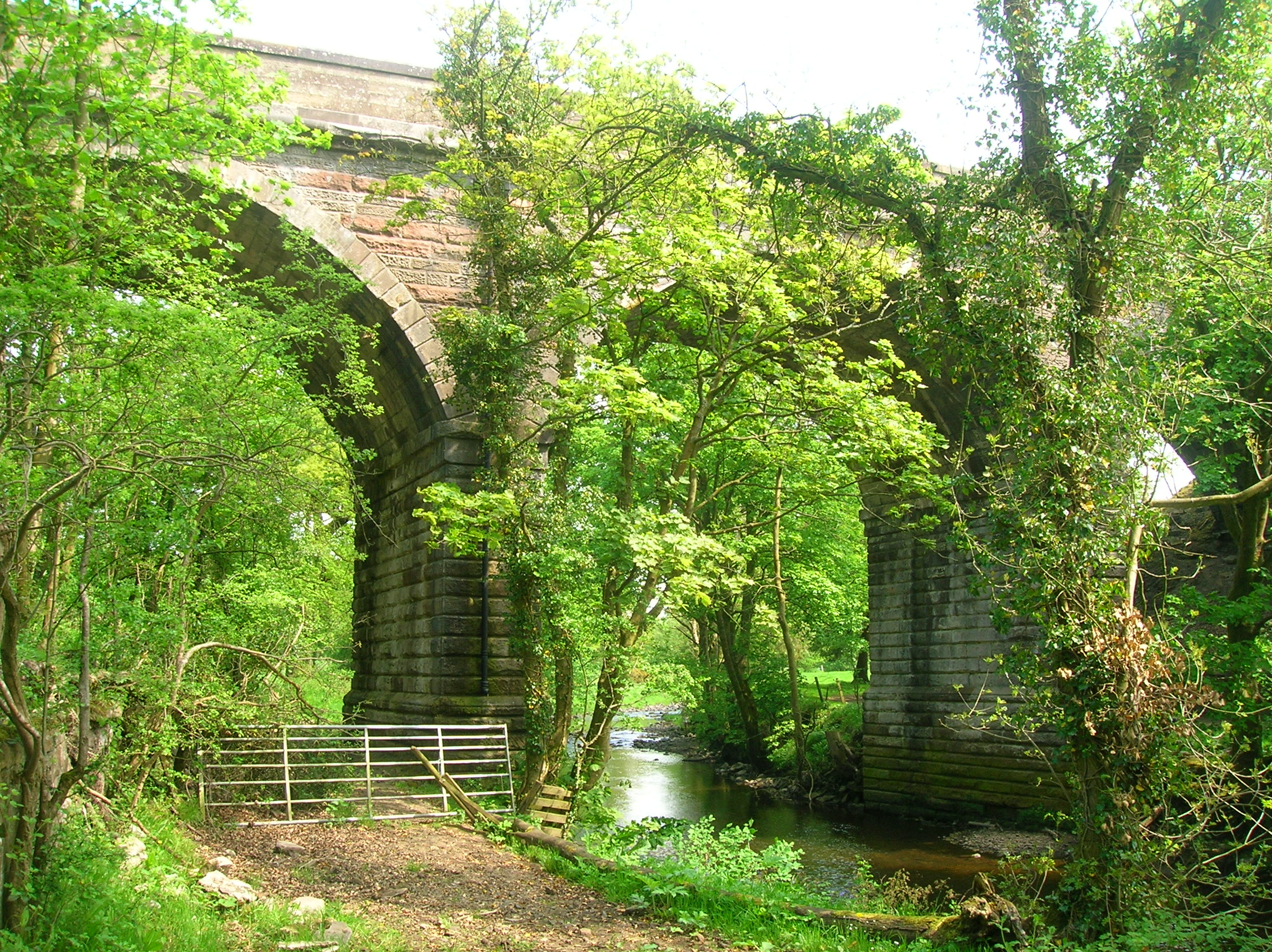
A view of the Annick Viaduct from the banks of the Annick Water.

Nearby a network of mineral railways linked the collieries at Annick Lodge, Perceton and elsewhere to the main railway network. Annick Colliery and the coal pit at East Wood linked directly to the G&SWR main line, the Annick Colliery lay near to the road to Holehouse Farm. Perceton Colliery, near Law Farm, linked directly to Irvine on the line from Busbie (or Busby) Junction at Crosshouse. A Fireclay Works was situated close to Springside where a coal pit was also located. Numerous old coal pits dot the area.

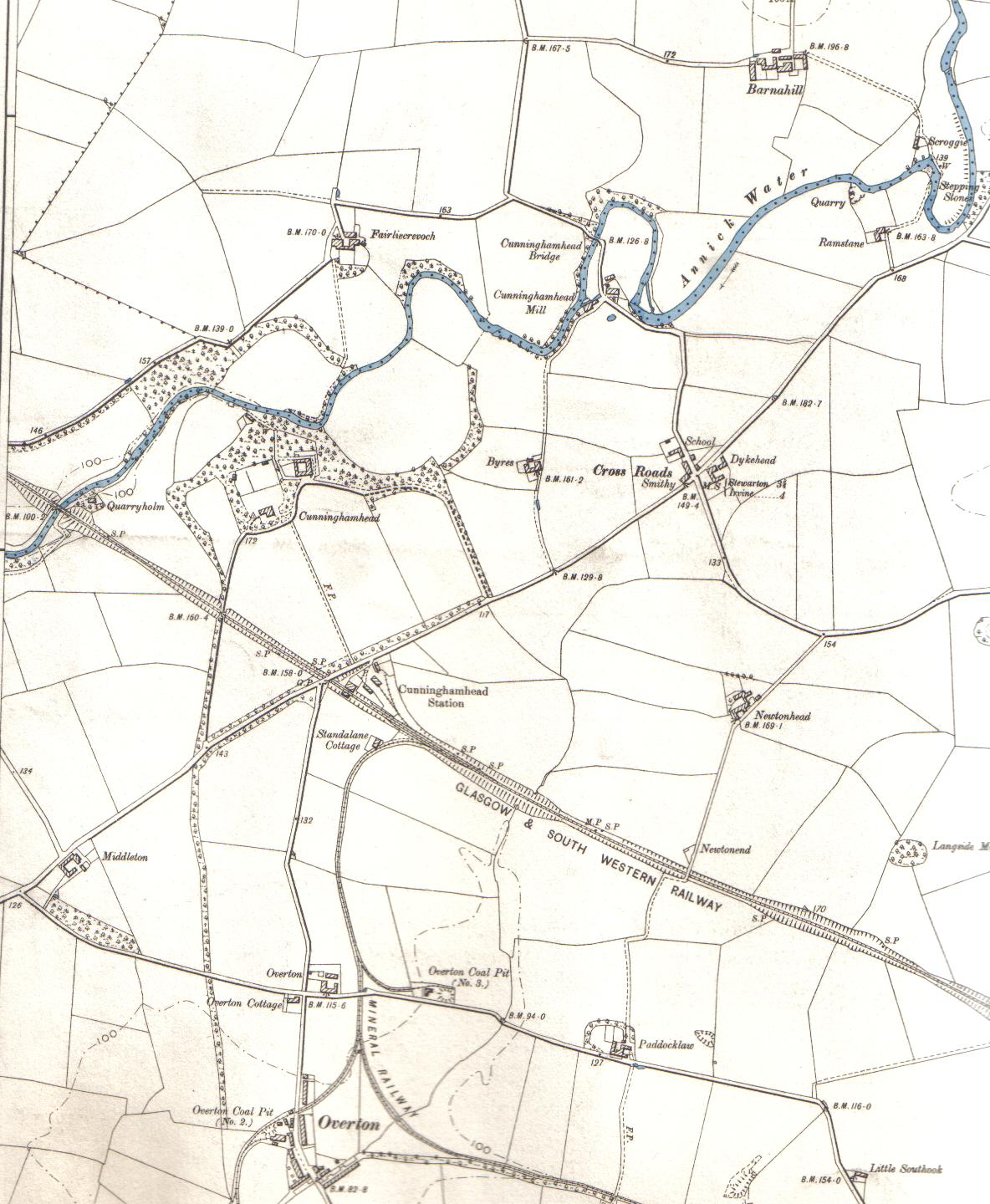
A map of the area in 1897.
