= Montgreenan railway station =

Former railway station in Scotland

Montgreenan
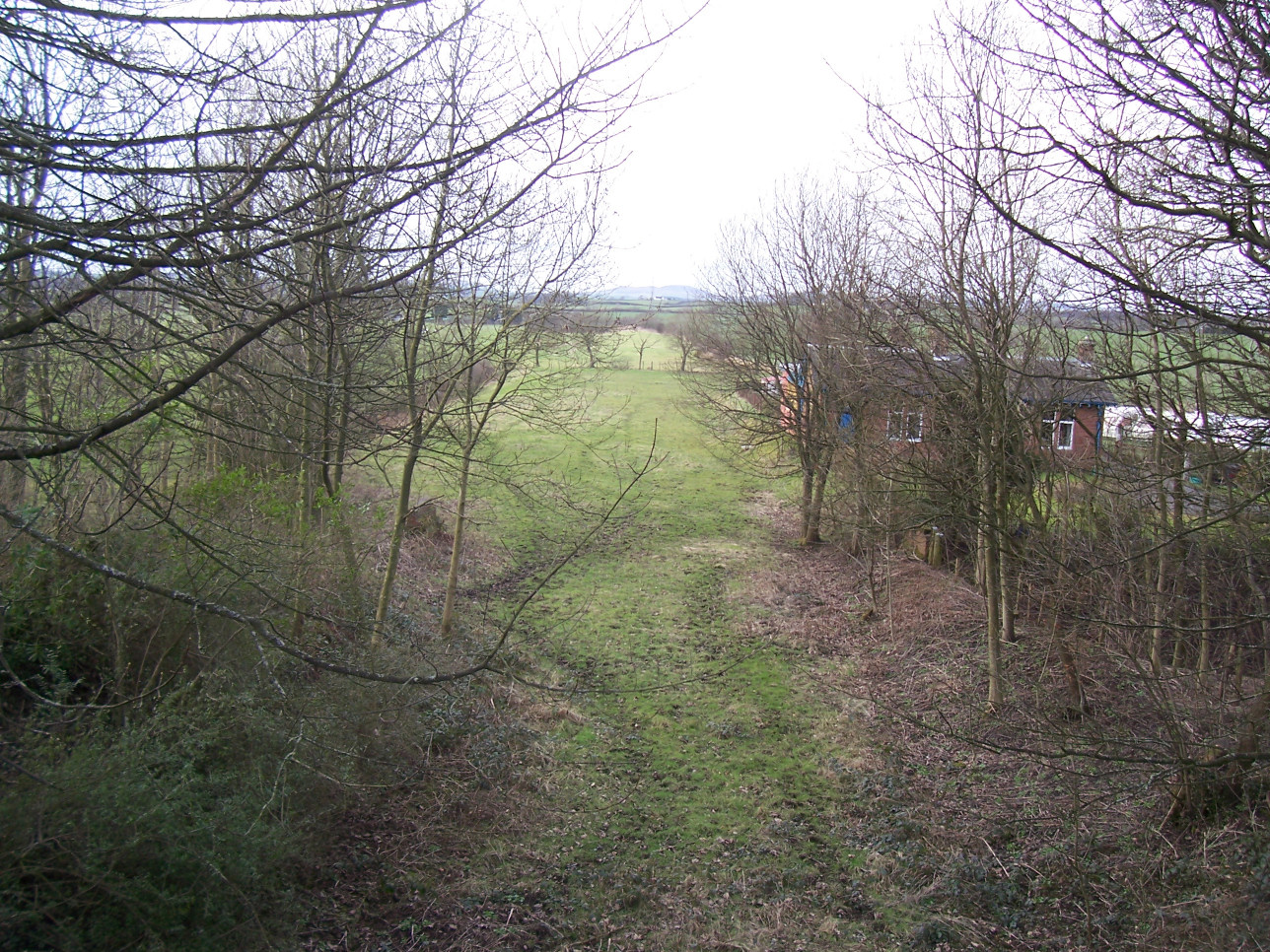
- The site of Montgreenan station in 2007

General information
- Location: Benslie, Ayrshire; Scotland
- Coordinates: 55.6554°N 4.6399°W
- Grid reference: NS340433
- Platforms: 2

Other information
- Status: Disused

History
- Pre-grouping: Glasgow and South Western Railway

Key dates
- 1 February 1878: Opened
- 7 March 1955: Closed
Location

Montgreenan railway station was a railway station near the village of Benslie, three miles north east of the town of Kilwinning, North Ayrshire, Scotland. The station was opened by the Glasgow and South Western Railway on the former Glasgow, Paisley, Kilmarnock and Ayr Railway.

== History ==
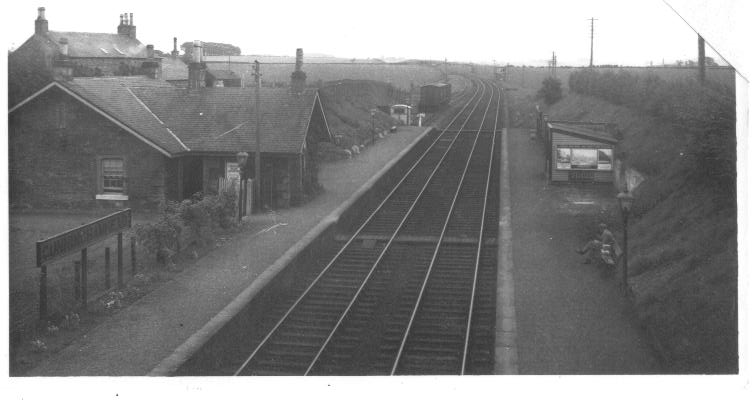
Cunninghamhead railway station looking south-east c. 1930.

The station opened on 1 February 1878, and closed permanently to passengers on 7 March 1955, although the line was still in use by freight trains and diverted passenger trains until 23 October 1973. Freight services had been withdrawn from the station in October 1955.

=== The station and goods facilities ===
In March 1873, the local laird, Mr. Robert Robertson Glasgow of Montgreenan had written, enclosing a petition, to the Board of Directors of the G&SWR requesting that a station be built at the Burnbrae. This request was turned down. In February 1874 the Montgreenan Coal Company applied for a siding to be built and this was laid and in use by 1875, however a dispute arose regarding the payment of the signalman's wages. Montgreenan colliery closed soon after. Freight traffic was such that the railway company purchased the dwelling of a local joiner, Mr. James Watson, for their agent in 1884. In 1886 the Traffic Committee submitted a request for a house and offices to be constructed at Montgreenan and at a cost of £708 14s 4d the present station was built. Access to the two platforms was achieved by wooden steps from the road overbridge at the southern end. The down platform had a simple wooden shelter with the main station buildings on the up side. The station building with its red sandstone facing and awning was similar to that of Cunninghamhead. The goods shed, built in 1902 at a cost of £380, had a siding running through it and a short siding ran up to a loading bank.

=== Important visitors ===
The Royal Train of King George VI once spent a few hours at Montgreenan to allow the King to have his lunch. Local police and Special Branch protected the train, and it was closed for the duration of his visit. The Chairman of the G&SWR from 1915 to 1920 was Sir James Bell of Montgreenan House and he used the station regularly, avoiding the waiting room by waiting in his horse-drawn carriage.

== Passenger services ==
The station served the local villages at Doura, Fergushill and Benslie, which were well populated up until the early years of the 20th century, when outdated mining village houses were demolished and the inhabitants moved to better accommodation in Kilwinning. The Montgreenan and Eglinton estates nearby also provided freight and passenger traffic for the station. At its best the station had nine up and eleven down trains, but no train service on Sundays. By 1950 the decline in passenger traffic had resulted in only one train a day running to Glasgow and three to Kilmarnock.

== Freight services ==
As stated the Montgreenan Coal Company had a siding and Fergushill and Doura collieries had links to the main line either side of the station. A sawmill at Burnbrae may have provided some traffic and curiously the Nobel Explosive company of Stevenston had a store at the station. In 1913 one daily goods and two mineral freight trains stopped at Montgreenan as required on their way to Kilmarnock. In 1942 the army took over the Eglinton Estate and other nearby buildings, resulting in equipment and vehicles being transported via Montgreenan. The stock and farm equipment from Eglinton Mains farm had been transported down south in 1925 via Montgreenan.

== The station today ==
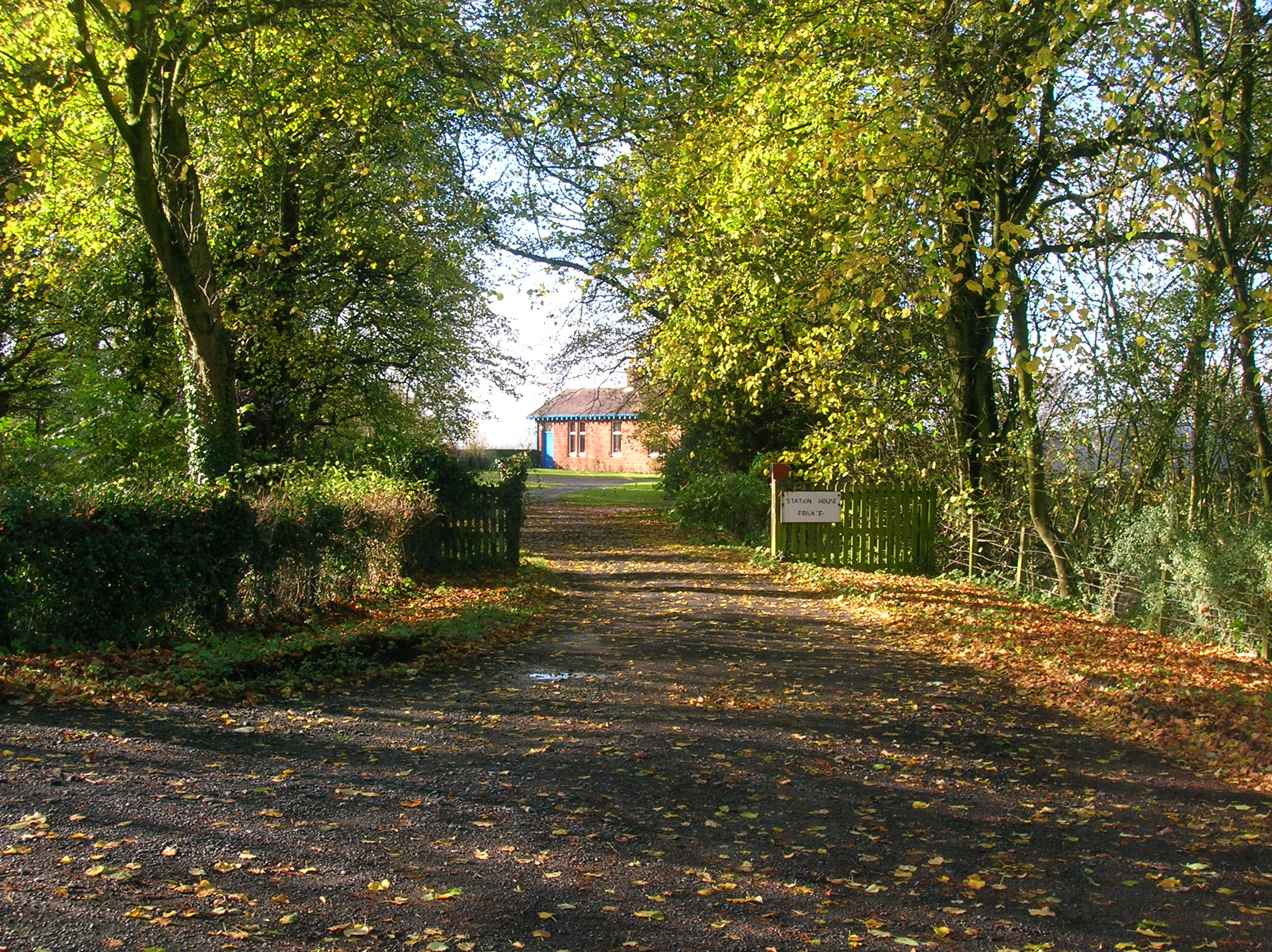
Montgreenan railway station and driveway in 2007.

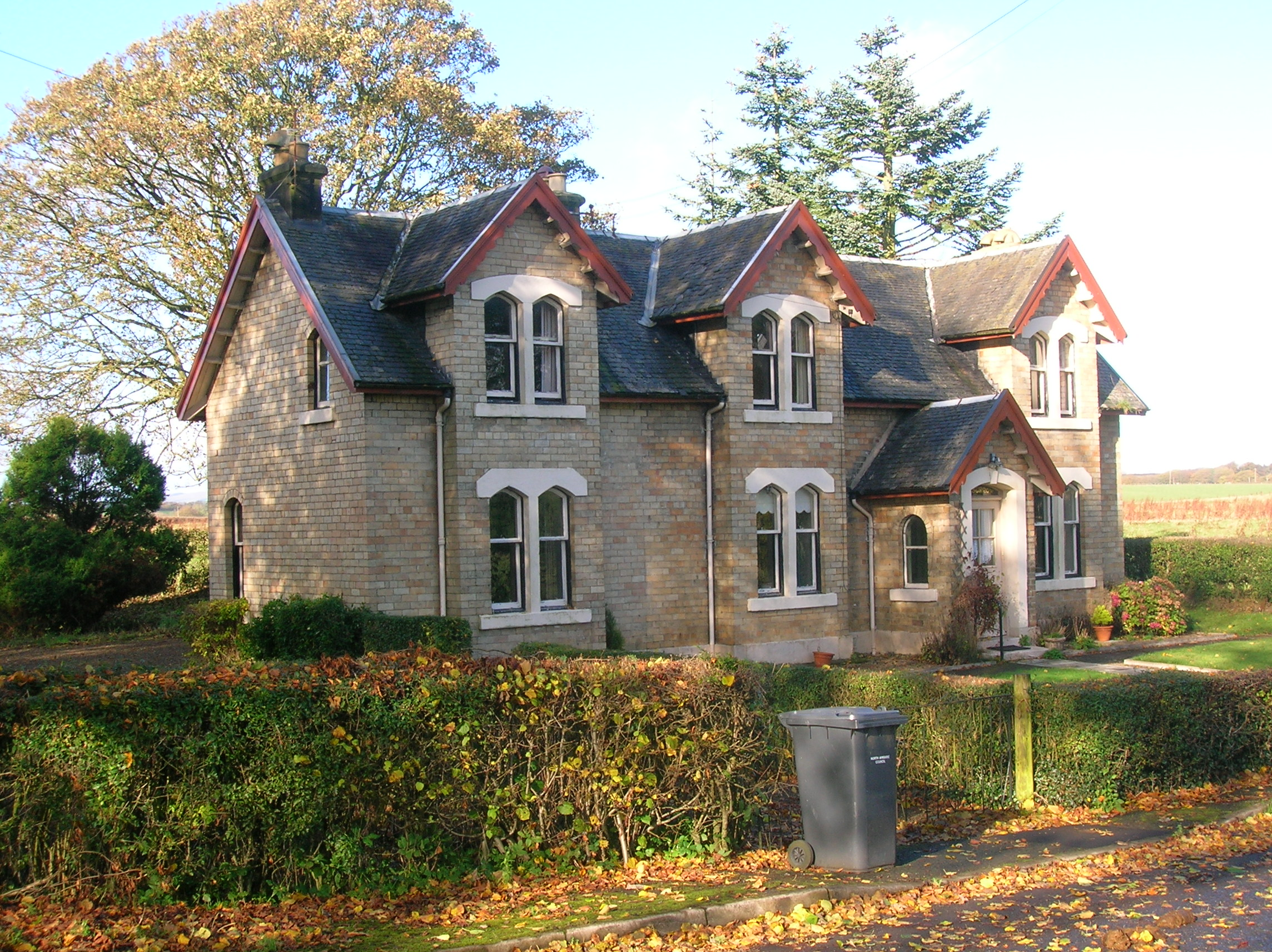
Janburrow, Fergushill church's old manse and previously the G&SWR company agent's office near Montgreenan.

The station building still exists today, now a private residence. The road overbridge is still in use and the track space between the platforms has been filled in.

Preceding station	Historical railways	Following station
Cunninghamhead; Line and station closed	Glasgow and South Western Railway; Glasgow, Paisley, Kilmarnock and Ayr Railway	Dalry; Line closed; station open
