= Robert Muir of Loanfoot =

Robert Muir
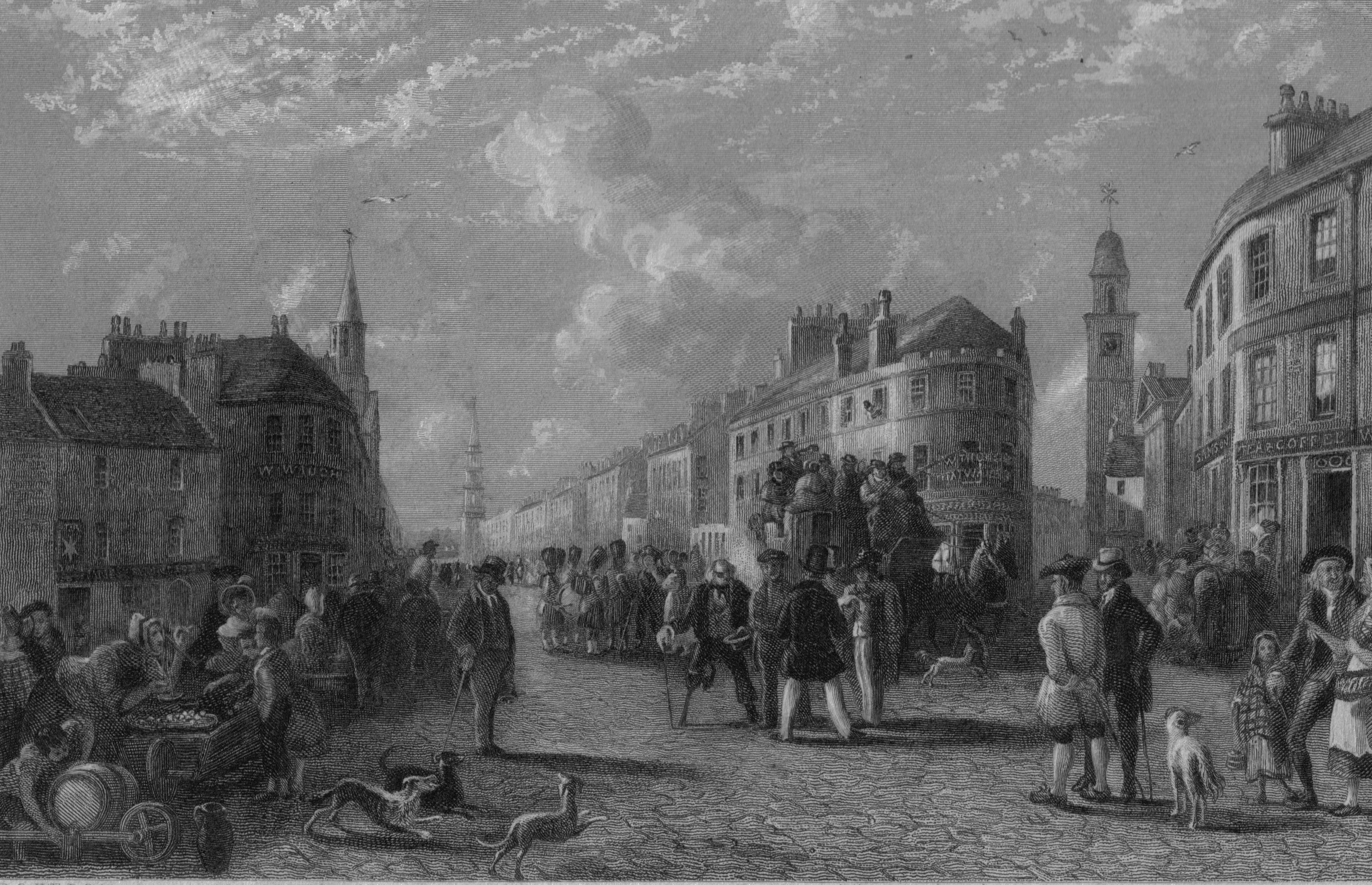
- Kilmarnock Cross in 1840
- Born: 1758; Loanfoot, East Ayrshire, Scotland
- Died: 22 April 1788; Kilmarnock, Scotland
- Occupation(s): Wine and spirit merchant

Robert Muir (1758–1788) was an estate owner as well as a very close friend and supporter of the poet Robert Burns and was most probably born on the family estate of Loanfoot (NS 415 380) near Kilmarnock in East Ayrshire, Scotland. He was also a wine and spirit merchant and is remembered in Robert Burns' poem titled "Epitaph on Robert Muir".

== Life and character ==
Loanfoot House and its small estate no longer exists with only the name Loanfoot Avenue off Irvine Road next to Annanhill House commemorating its previous existence. When Robert inherited the estate from his father it was greatly in debt, however by the time of his death it was solvent. He worked as a wine and spirit merchant in Kilmarnock. Never of a strong constitution Robert died in 1788 at the age of only 29 from tuberculosis.

== The Beanscroft Devil ==
A most unusual story that has Robert Muir as a central participant with John Goldie the 'Philosopher' at its heart is the tale of the 'Beanscroft Devil' set at the time of the poet Robert Burns.

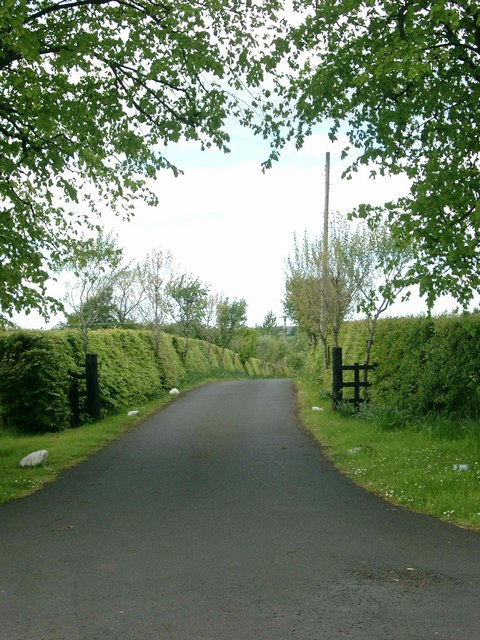
The entrance lane to Beanscroft Farm.

Beanscroft Farm lies on Grassyards Road in the parish of Fenwick in East Ayrshire a few miles to the west of Kilmarnock and the farmer there was known as a good, honest, hard work and God fearing member of the community, however strange happenings at the farmhouse and in the byres slowly convinced him and his family that he was being regularly tormented by none other a personage than the Devil himself. The other worldly disturbances had started in a minor way with sounds and movements that could be ascribed to the wind or the cat, however shifting furniture, strange shrieks and howls, etc. could not be so easily dismissed and the strange appearance of moving lights of different colours and the breaking of the ropes that tethered the cattle without signs of cutting were beyond any straight forward explanation. The farmer's son and heir had apparently done his best without success to solve the riddle, but his parents had always stayed rooted to the spot with fear in the farmhouse whilst the son ventured forth.

John Goldie the 'Philosopher' was God fearing, but had no truck with the presence on Earth of the Devil and made it known that he could solve this riddle in a Sherlock Holmes style of logical investigation. Despite his reservations the farmer invited him to the farm, accompanied by his friends, Mr Gillies of Kilmaurs the 'New Licht' minister and Robert Muir a Kilmarnock merchant and Kirk elder. After a number of questions relating to possible enemies and an inspection of the broken ropes he declared that this was the work of man and not the Devil. Swearing the farmer to secrecy he advised him to hide in the byre that night. Once darkness had fallen the farmer, hiding in the byre as instructed, became aware of the usual disturbances and suddenly saw a shadowy figure of a man holding a trumpet-like instrument with which he was making the unnatural sounds that had scared him so, rushing forward he seized the culprit only to find that it was his own son.

It transpired that the son had some knowledge of chemistry and had made what we would call coloured fireworks and that the ropes had been severed with Nitric Acid, then known as Aqua Fortis (strong water). John Goudie had logically deducted that the son, hoping to scare his father into retirement so that he could run the farm, was the 'Devil on Earth'. The 'philosophers' reputation was greatly enhanced whilst the son was mortified and humiliated to the extent that he left Ayrshire and was never seen in these parts again.

== Association with Robert Burns ==
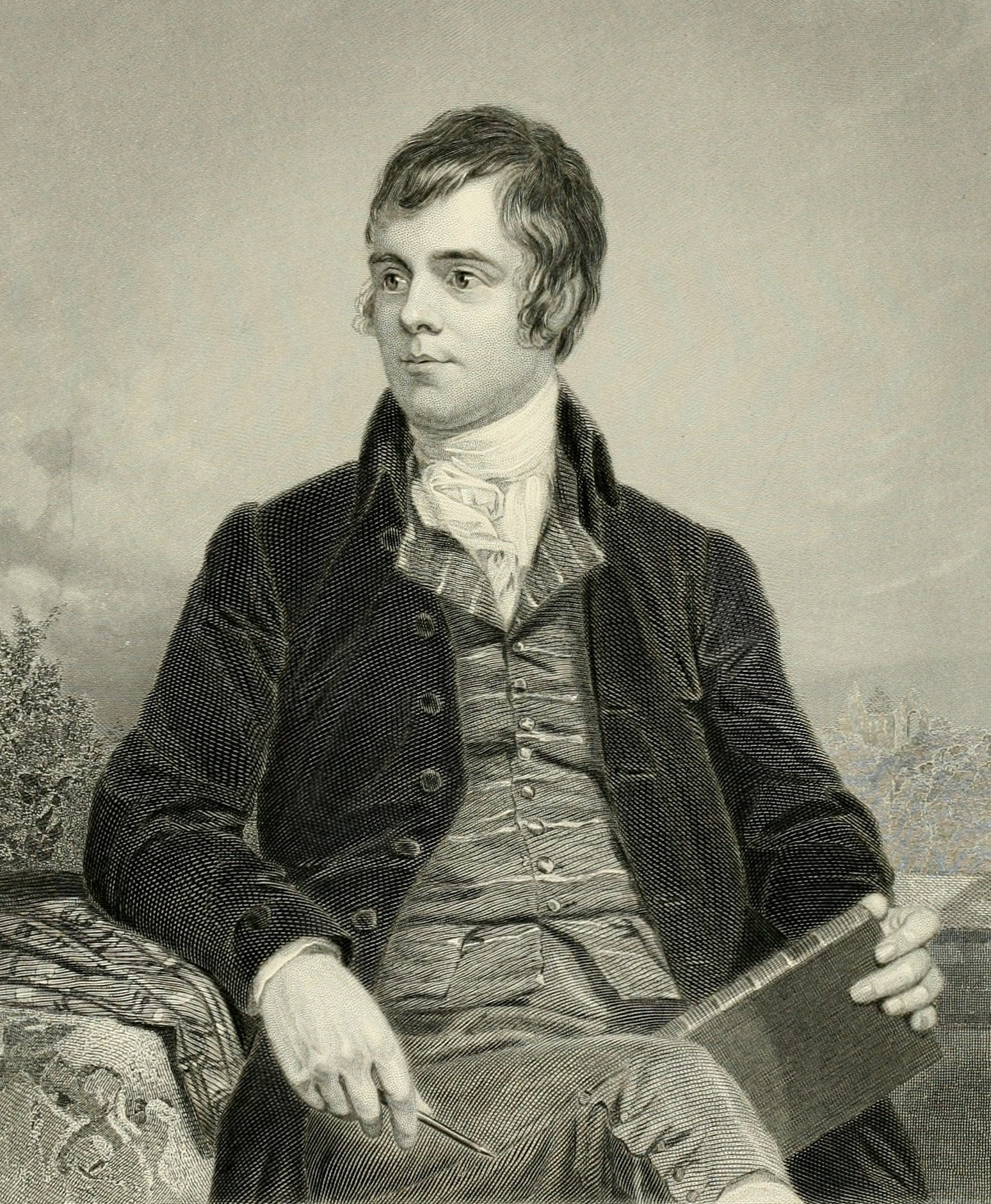
Robert Burns

Robert Muir first met the bard in 1786, probably at Kilmarnock's Bowling Green House Inn, and subscribed for no fewer that seventy-two copies of the 1786 Kilmarnock volume or "Poems, Chiefly in the Scottish Dialect" and forty of the 1787 Edinburgh Edition. He therefore played a central part in ensuring the publication of his friends poems. He had tried to take sixty copies of the Edinburgh Edition but Burns, knowing his straitened circumstances, refused him, writing that "Your affair of sixty copies is also like you: but it would not be like me to comply."

He was one of the first people that Burns informed of the birth of his first twins carried by Jean Armour. Writing from Mossgiel Farm on the following morning of Friday 8 September 1786, Burns said: "My Friend My Brother, You will have heard that poor Armour has repaid my amorous mortgages double. A very fine boy and girl have awakened a thousand feelings that thrill, some with tender pleasure, and some with foreboding anguish, thro' my soul."

Burns' "Epitaph on Robert Muir":

What Man could esteem, or what
Woman could love,
Was He who lies under this sod:
If Such Thou refusest admittance above,
Then whom wilt thou favor, Good God!

On 13 December 1789 Burns wrote to Mrs Frances Dunlop in the strange 'conscience' letter about Highland Mary. Gilbert Burns wrote that the death of Robert, his closest Kilmarnock friend, in his thirtieth year deeply affected his brother, writing that "Mr Robert Muir, merchant in Kilmarnock, was one of those early friends that Robert's poetry procured him, and was dear to his heart." Burns stated that Robert Muir was one of those he hoped to meet:

"if there is a world to come... There should I meet the friend, the disinterested friend of my early life: the man who rejoiced to see me, because he loved me and could serve me - Muir, thy weaknesses were the aberration of Human-nature, but thy heart glowed with everything generous, manly and noble; and if ever emanation from the All-good Being animated a human form it was thine".

=== Letters to Robert Muir ===
This correspondence reveals a great deal about the significance of their relationship and gives deep insights into the personality of the poet:

A letter of 20 March 1786 had an enclosed a copy of his poem "Scotch Drink" and promised plans for a convivial meeting:

"I hope, sometimes before we hear the Gowk [Scots for a cuckoo], to have the pleasure of seeing you, at Kilmarnock, when, I intend we shall have a gill between us, in a Mutchkin-stoup, which will be a great comfort and consolation."

On 18 November 1786 Burns wrote a short note to Robert Muir and enclosed a copy of "Tam Samson's elegy".

On 15 December 1786 Burns wrote from Edinburgh saying:

"I am still undetermined as to the future; and, as usual, never think of it. I have now neither house nor home that I can all my own, and live on the world at large. I am just a poor wayfaring Pilgrom on the road to Parnassus; thoughtless wanderer and sojourner in a strange land."

On 20 December 1786 Burns wrote to Robert who had tried to subscribe to sixty copies of the Edinburgh Edition but Burns, knowing his straitened circumstances, refused him, reducing it to forty, writing that "Your affair of sixty copies is also like you: but it would not be like me to comply."

In 1787 Burns wrote from Stirling expressing his high emotions at visiting the tomb of Sir John Graham of Sir William Wallace fame at Falkirk. as well as the site of the Battle of Bannockburn with its borestone where the Royal Standard was raised by Robert the Bruce.

On 7 March 1788 Robert Burns wrote to Robert Muir clearly expressing in detail his religious beliefs, also hoping that: "the Spring will renew your shattered frame and make your friends happy".

"If we lie down in the grave, the whole nun a piece of broke machinery, to moulder with the clods of the valley — be it so; at least there is an end of pain, care, woes and wants: if that part of us called Mind, does survive the apparent destruction of the man - away with old-wife prejudices and tales! Every age and every nation has had a different set of stories; and as the many are always weak, of consequence they have often, perhaps always been deceived: a man, conscious of having acted an honest part among his fellow creatures; even granting that he may have been the sport, at times of passions and instincts; he goes to a great unknown Being who could have no other end in giving him existence but to make him happy; who gave him those passions and instincts, and well knows their force."

== Micro-history ==
Robert was a Kilmarnock kirk elder.

Burns wrote that Gilbert kerr of Stodrig Farm near Kelso reminded him of Robert Muir.

== See also ==
- John Goldie
