= Robert Burns and the Eglinton Estate =

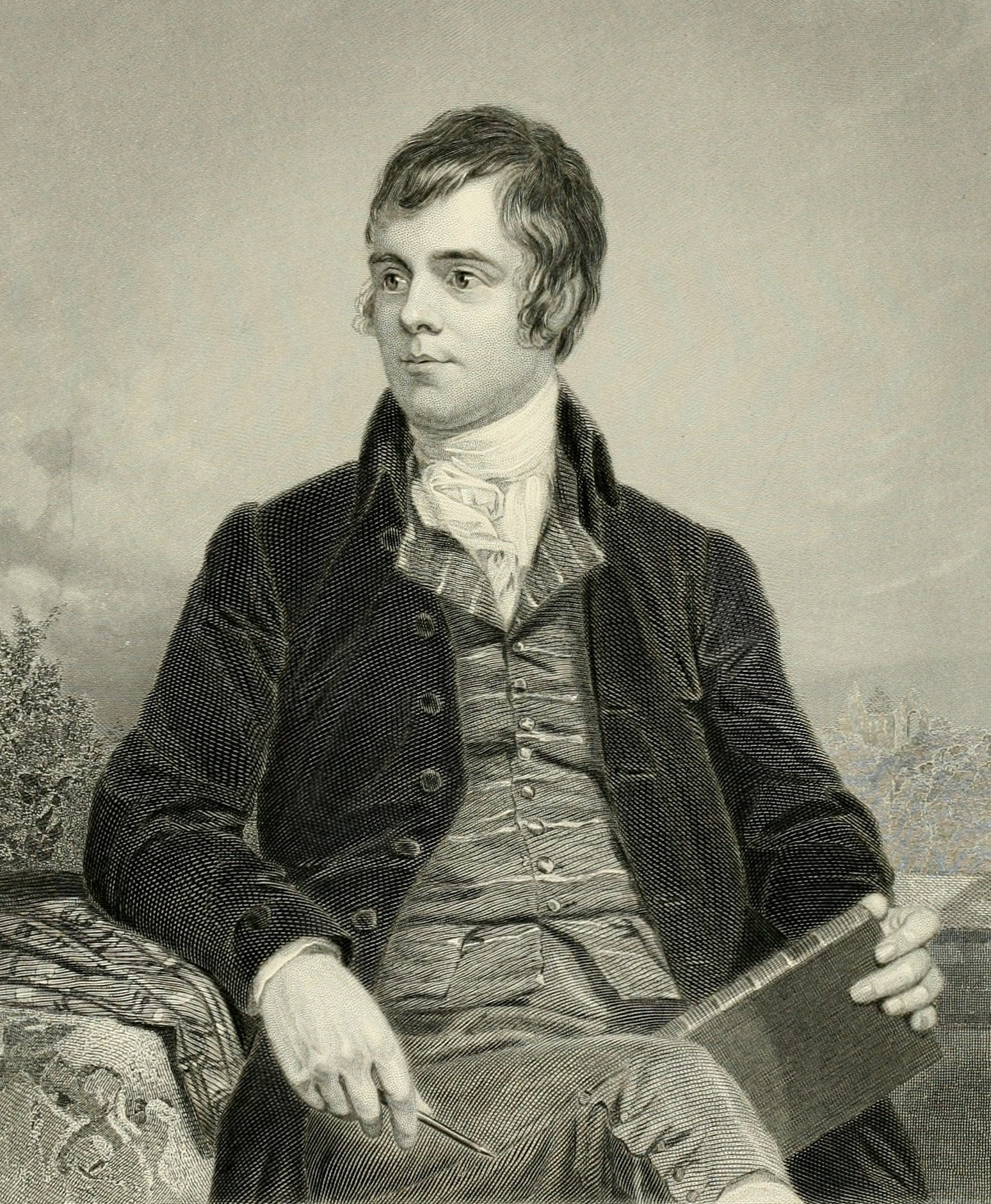
Robert Burns by Alexander Nasmyth, 1787

During the years 1781–1782, at the age of 23, Robert Burns (1759–1796) lived in Irvine, North Ayrshire for a period of around 9 months, whilst learning the craft of flax-dressing from Alexander Peacock, who may have been his mother's half-brother, working at the heckling shop in the Glasgow Vennel. Dr John Cumming of Milgarholm, a provost of Irvine, claimed that he had invited Burns to come to Irvine to learn flax dressing. During this time he made a number of acquaintances, befriended several locals and took regular walks into the Eglinton Woods via the old Irvine to Kilwinning toll road and the Drukken or Drucken (Drunken) Steps. Steps over the Red Burn and back via the site of Saint Brides or Bryde's Well at Stanecastle. Burns had several other connections with the Eglinton Estate and other branches of the Montgomerie family. He probably left in March 1782.

== The Montgomeries, Earls of Eglinton ==
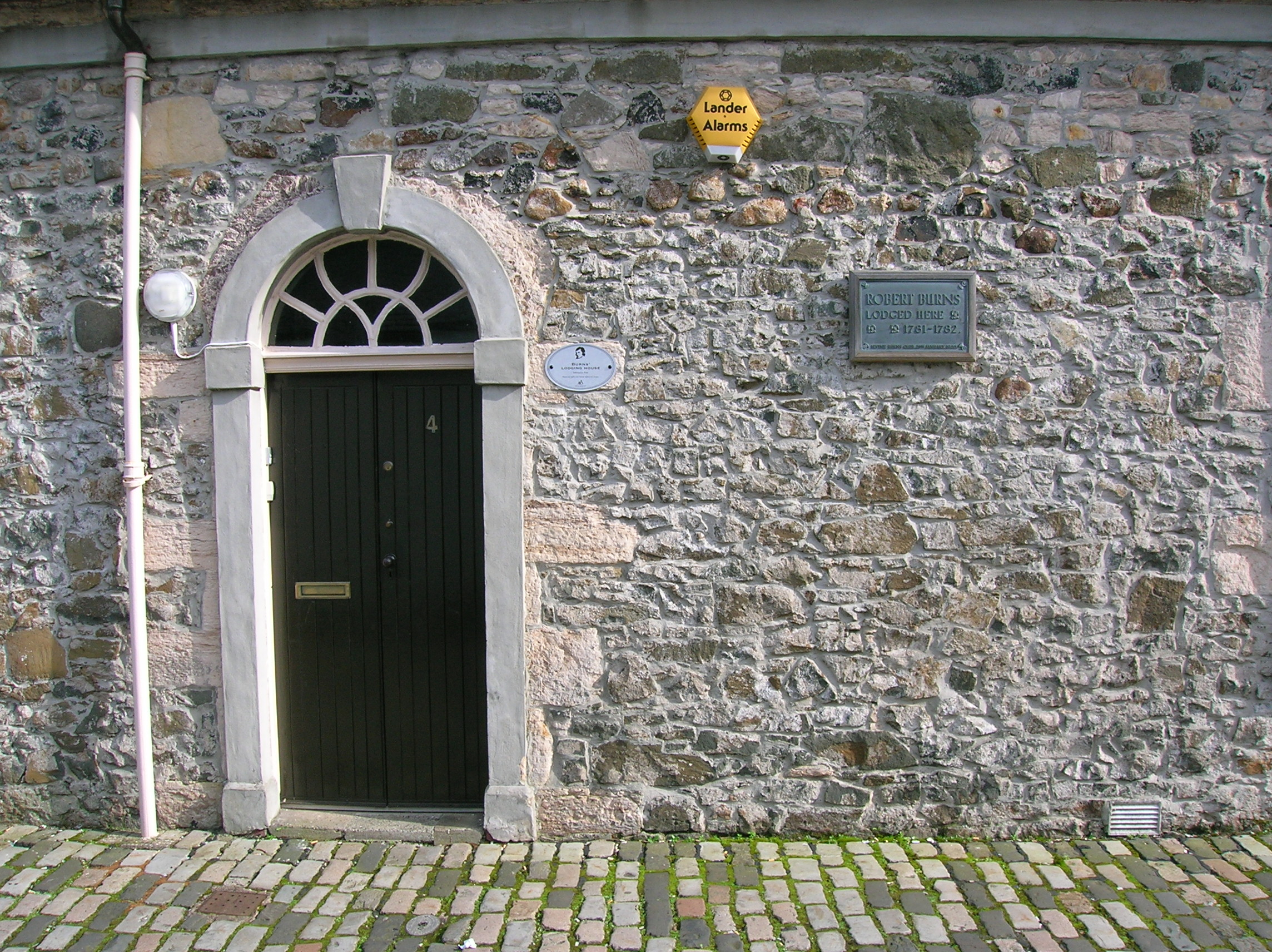
Robert Burn's lodgings in the Glasgow Vennel

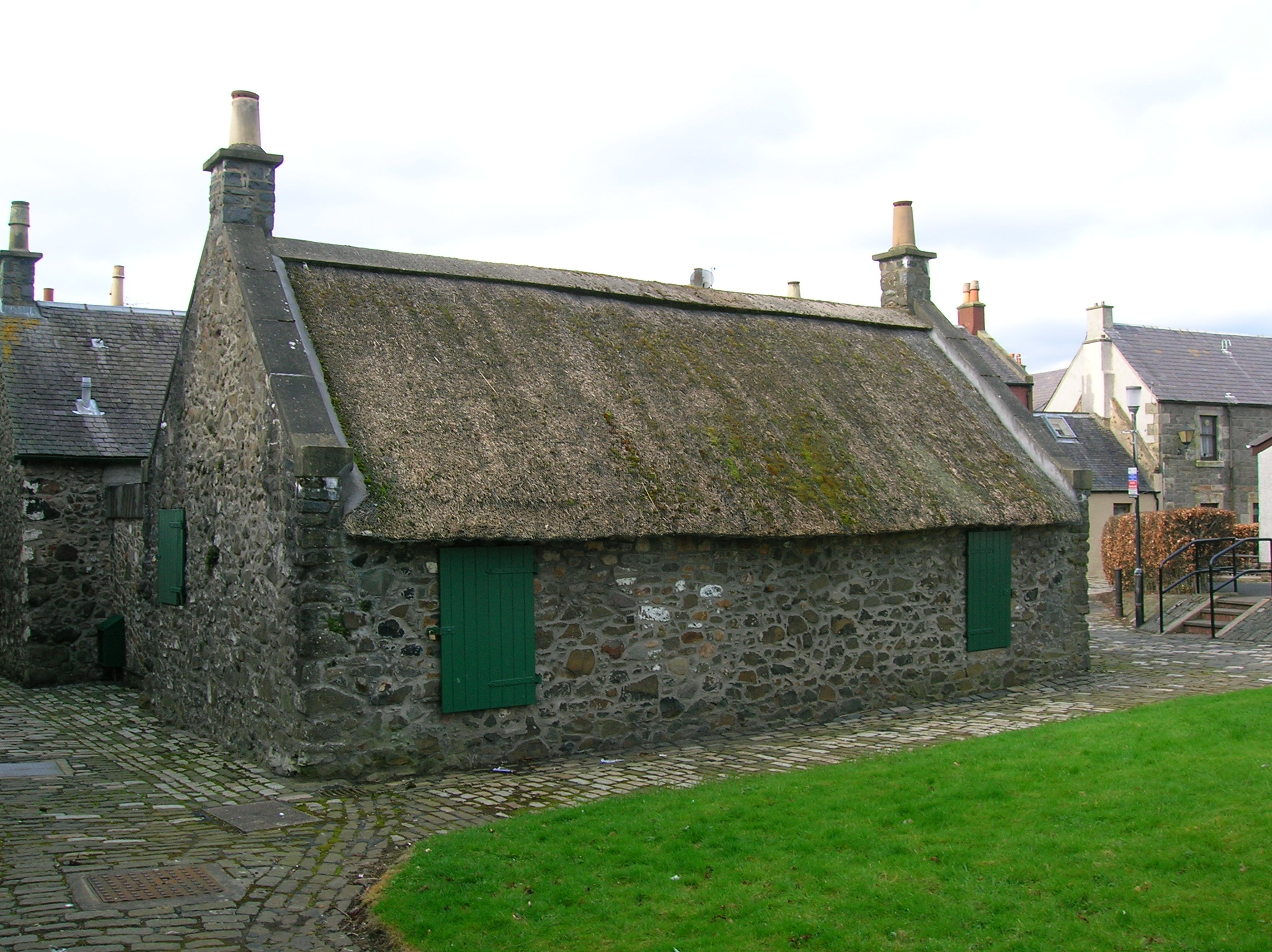
The Heckling Shop in Irvine where Robert Burns worked 1781–1782

Mrs. Frances Dunlop of Dunlop, Patron of Robert Burns

Archibald Montgomerie, the eleventh Earl of Eglinton (1726–96) succeeded to the title in 1769. He was known as General Montgomerie, having raised the 77th Regiment of Foot in the Highlands in 1757, of which he was appointed Lieutenant-Colonel in command.

Archibald, the 11th Earl, stood as guarantor for the printing of the 1786 'Kilmarnock Edition' of Robert Burns' poems, together with John Goldie and John Hamilton, later Dr. Hamilton, a medical student and son of Provost Charles Hamilton of Irvine. The Hamiltons lived at the entry to the Glasgow Vennel close to Burns ' lodgings and may have been a link in his coming to Irvine in the first instance.

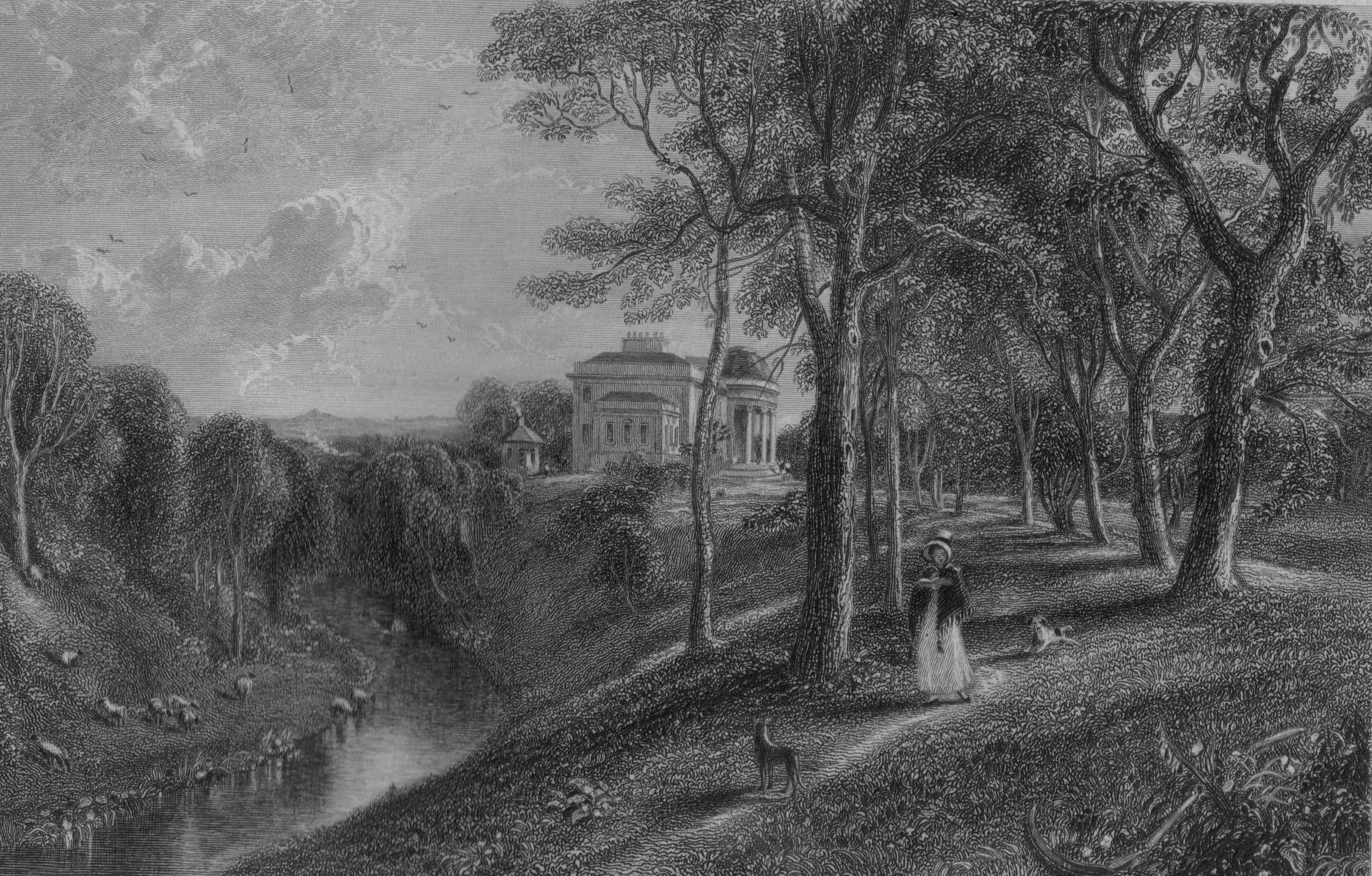
Coilsfield House (Montgomery Castle) in 1840.

The Earl of Eglinton also sent ten guineas to Burns on his arrival in Edinburgh as a subscription for a 'brace', that is two copies, quoted however as 42 by most authors (36 by one and in the subscribers list) of the Edinburgh Edition of the Poems. At 5s for subscribers and 6s for others, 10 guineas for two would have been extremely generous. and the actual intention is quoted as To bespeak (order in advance) the new edition and hand him a suitable gift of money. Mrs. Dunlop of Dunlop, a regular correspondent of Burns, had spoken to her friend Doctor John Moore about Burns as a Miracle of Genius and it was this 'Kind Man' who had encouraged the Earl to become a patron of Burns.

Writing in response to the Earl's purchase on 11 January 1787, Burns said:

Your Munificence, my Lord, certainly deserved my very grateful acknowledgements, but your Patronage is a bounty peculiarly suited to my feelings.

The Earls retained their interest in Burns as shown by the subscribers list in James Currie's The Complete Works of Burns, the first major work on the life and works of Burns, published in 1800. The 12th Earl subscribed for 12 copies; more copies than most subscribers who were not actually in the book trade.

The Montgomeries in general and Colonel Hugh Montgomerie (Sodger Hugh) in particular, are included in Burns' 'The Author's Earnest Cry and Prayer' of 1776, dedicated "To the Right Honourable and Honourable Scotch Representatives in the House of Commons."

These lines refer to the Earl:-

Earnest Cry and Prayer

"Thee, sodger Hugh, my watchman stented,
If bardees e'er are represented,
I ken, if that your sword was wanted,
Ye'd lend your hand;
But when there's ought to say anent it,
Ye'r at a stand."

This stanza was suppressed in Burns' first editions, even though it was well known that Sodger Hugh found it 'easier to do a thing than to talk about it'.

Burns also wrote the following lines:-

On A Dog of Lord Eglintons

"I never barked when out of season,
I never bit without a reason;
I ne'er insulted weaker brother,
Nor wronged by force or fraud another.
We brutes are placed a rank below;
Happy for man could he say so."

The 12th Earl of Eglinton, 'Sodger Hugh' was a third cousin of the 11th Earl, originally lived at Coilsfield House near Tarbolton, where Burns's 'Highland Mary', probably Mary Campbell, had been a byre woman and possibly the mistress of the Earl's brother, Captain James Montgomerie of Coilsfield. She had previously worked for Gavin Hamilton in Mauchline. Mary Campbell inspired some of Burns' finest and most famous poems.

Burns wrote the following lines about his separation from Mary Campbell at Coilsfield (Montgomery Castle): –

"Ye banks and braes and streams around
The castle of Montgomerie,
Green be your woods, and fair your flowers,
Your waters never drumlie!
There simmer first unfauld her robes,
And there the longest tarry!
For there I took the last fareweel
O' my Sweet Highland Mary."

The 12th Earl's sister, Lillias, married John Hamilton of Sundrum, who was appointed 'Oversman', or referee, in Robert Burns' father's dispute with his landlord David McLure.

Montgomerie's Peggy, Peggy Thompson, was another of Burns' dalliances. Peggy was a 'superior servant', possibly the housekeeper of Coilsfield House and Burns made her acquaintance through passing billets doux (love letters) to her at church. He vowed to her:-

Montgomerie's Peggy

"Were I a Baron proud and high,
And horse and servants waiting ready,
Then a' 'twad gie o'joy to me –
The shairin't wi' Montgomerie's Peggy."

It was clear to him that she loved another, and Burns wrote that it took him a few months to get over her.

== Irvine and the Drukken Steps ==
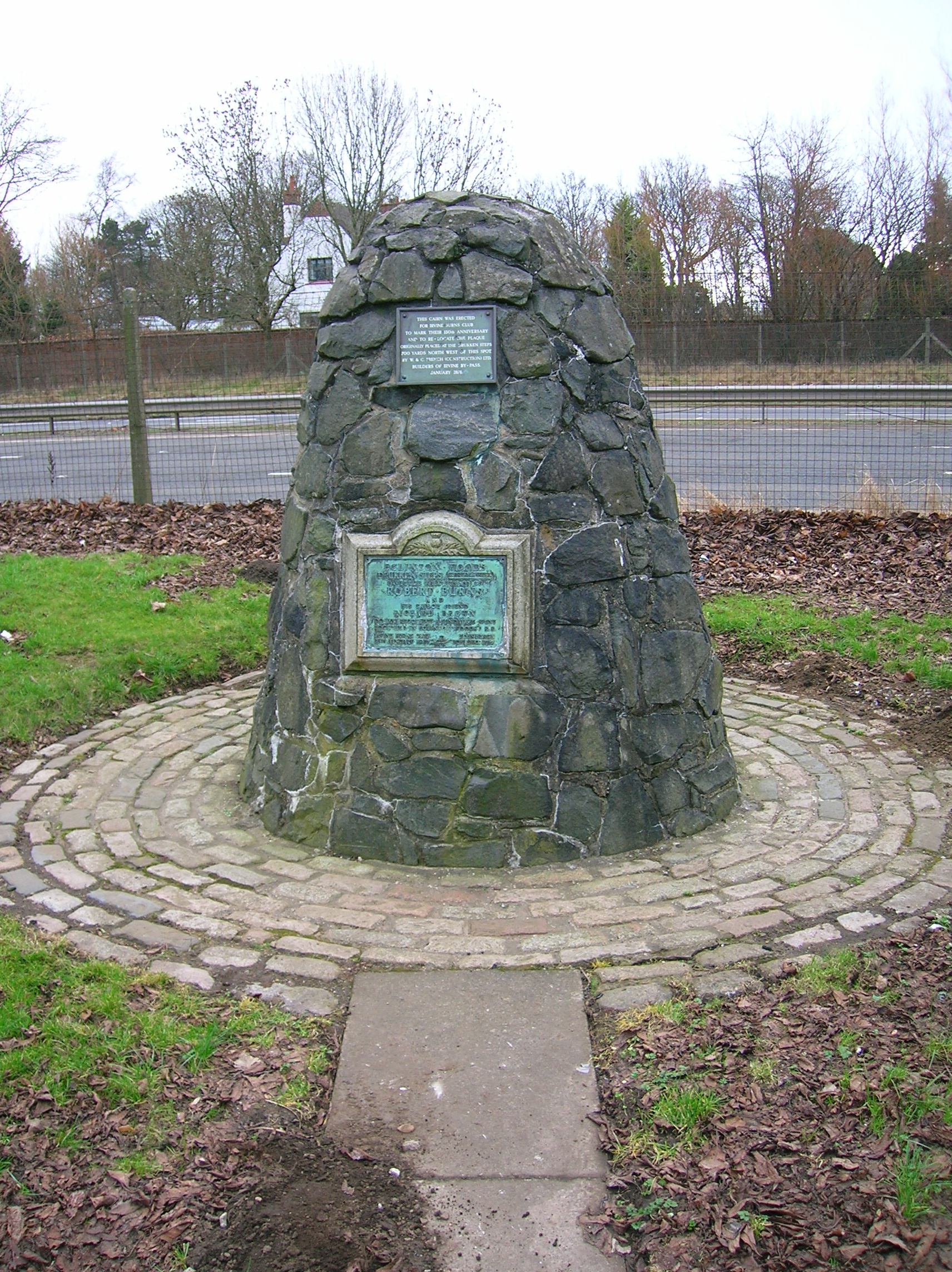
The Drukken Steps / Saint Bryde's Well commemorative cairn as relocated in 1976

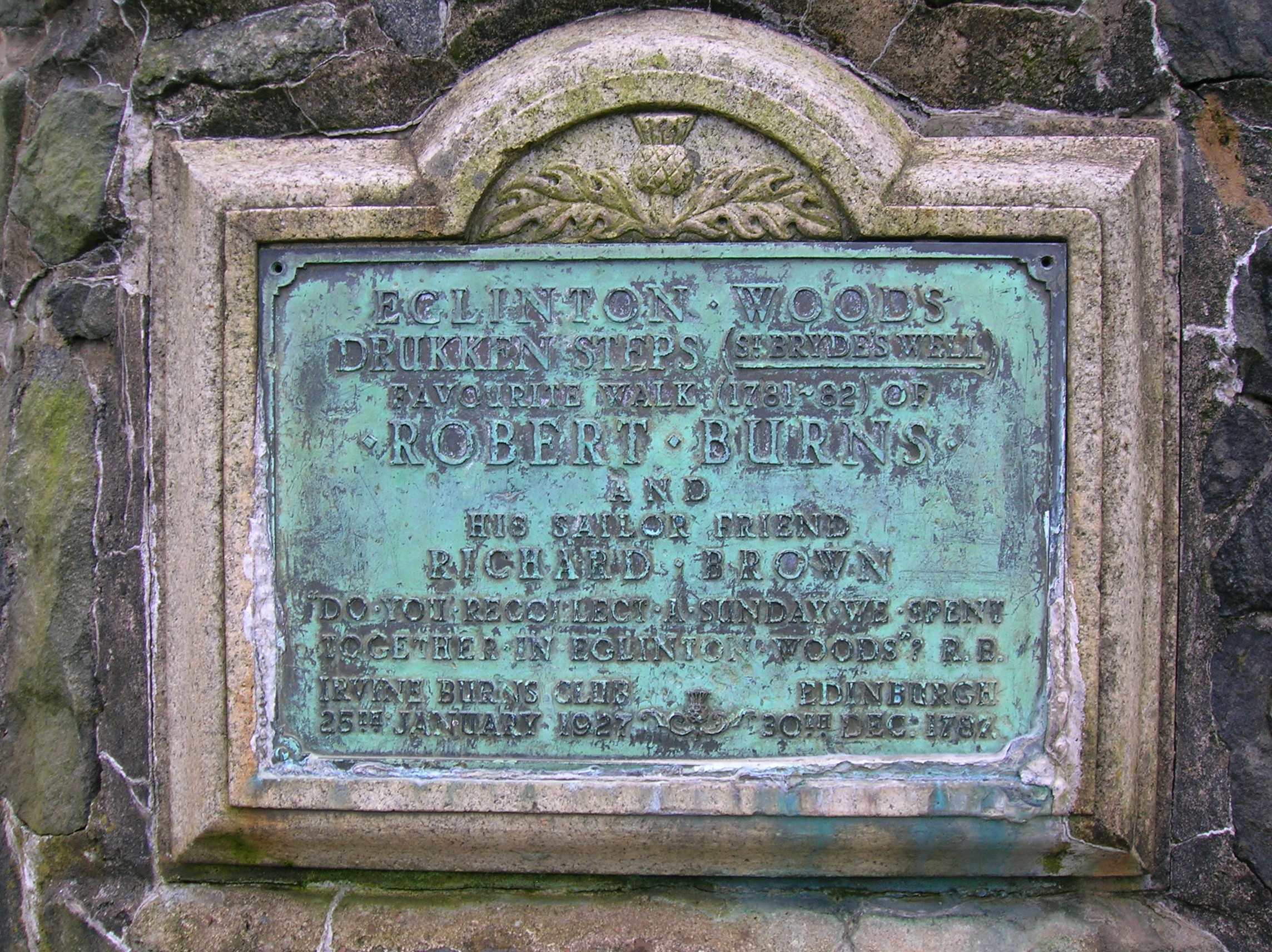
The commemorative plaque on the Drukken Cairn, first unveiled by Sir Andrew Duncan, Irvine Burns Club President.

Robert Burns wrote to Richard Brown, or Ritchie Broun, (1753–1833), on 30 December 1787, saying My will o' wisp fate, you know: do you remember a Sunday we spent together in Eglinton Woods? You told me, on my repeating some verses to you that you wondered I could resist the temptation of sending verses of such merit to a magazine. Therefore, it was Richard Brown who gave Burns the idea, in the woodlands of the Eglinton estate, that he should publish his work. In confirmation, Burns wrote the following to Brown, Twas actually this that gave me an idea of my own pieces which encouraged me to endeavour at the character of a Poet. Burns did not, as we shall see, follow his friend's advice immediately, for five years elapsed before he ventured into print. William Wallace is also said to have been familiar with these same woods.

Why the change of heart? Robert and his brother Gilbert took the farm of Mossgiel (Mauchline) after their father's death in 1784, and, struggling to make a living, Robert despaired of his future in farming and made some initial plans to emigrate to Jamaica. It was now that Richard Brown's encouragement to go into print bore fruit, and this at last led to the first published Kilmarnock Edition of his works appearing in 1786 to raise money for his proposed emigration.

John Goldie the 'Philosopher' is said to have met Robert Burns at Mossgiel Farm and after listening to his poems was sufficiently impressed to encourage him to have them printed and introduced him to several men of influence in Kilmarnock who ensured that the printing at John Wilson's press went ahead.

Richard Brown, a sea captain, had fought for the liberty of the Americans against the British, and the American struggle for freedom, obvious in the poet's early poems, can be attributed to Brown. The collection received so much praise, especially in Edinburgh, that Robert gave up the idea of emigration and went to Edinburgh instead to publish a second edition of his works. Richard Brown was one of the few people to receive a signed presentation copy of the Kilmarnock Edition of Burns' poems, found hidden in a piece of Richard Brown's household furniture after the captain's death.

Burns however later recalled in an autobiographical letter regarding his time spent in Irvine:

"Rhyme ... I had given up; but meeting Fergusson's Scotch Poems, I strung anew my wildly-sounding, rustic lyre with emulating vigour."

He is here referring to the poet Robert Fergusson (1750–1774).

=== Robin Cummell's account in fiction ===
Robin relates that one Sunday on his way to the kirk he met Richard Brown and Robert Burns at the Redburn Gate. They walked into the Eglinton beech woods and discussed how Burns' many friends, such as Davie Sillar and they, themselves, were greatly impressed by his poems. Burns stated that Auld Robin Gray was the king of ballads and reflected as to how many are not famous until they are dead. Richard Brown commented that princes royal and dukes might seek the throne and get it, thus encouraging Burns to publish his works.

=== The route of the old Toll Road ===
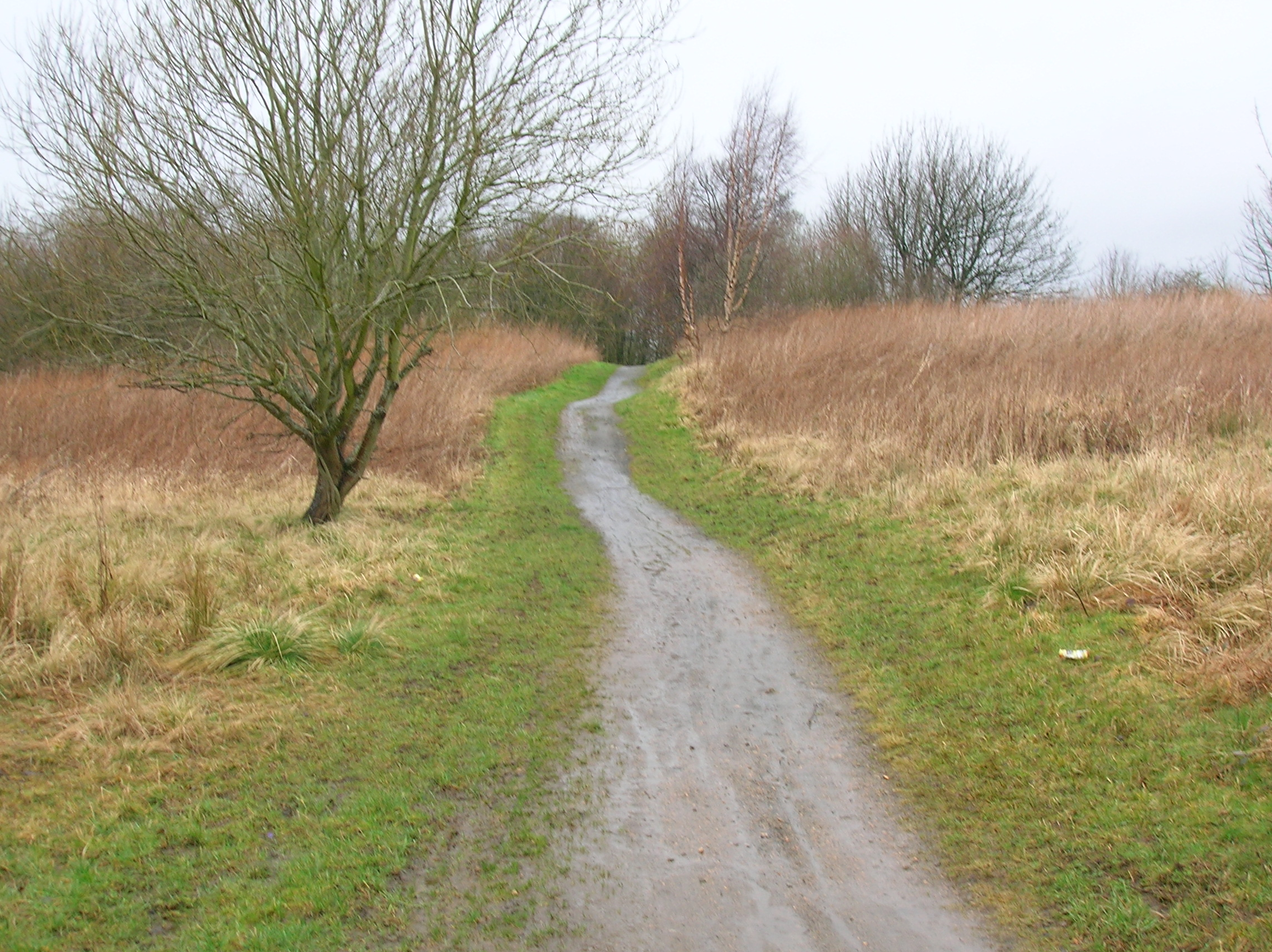
The old 1774 toll road up to The Higgins from the old Long Drive

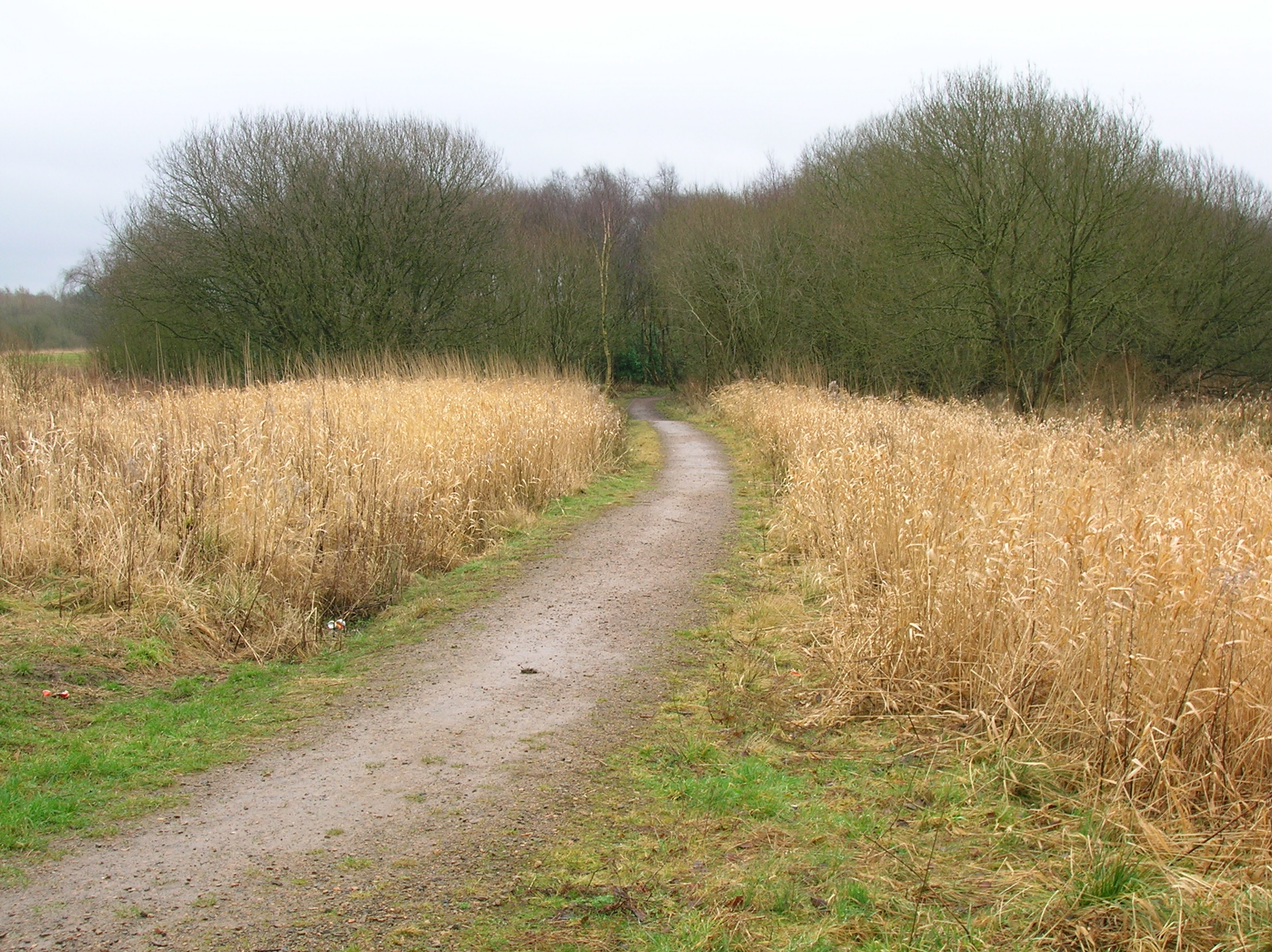
The old 1774 Toll Road looking towards the Drukken Steps from the old Long Drive

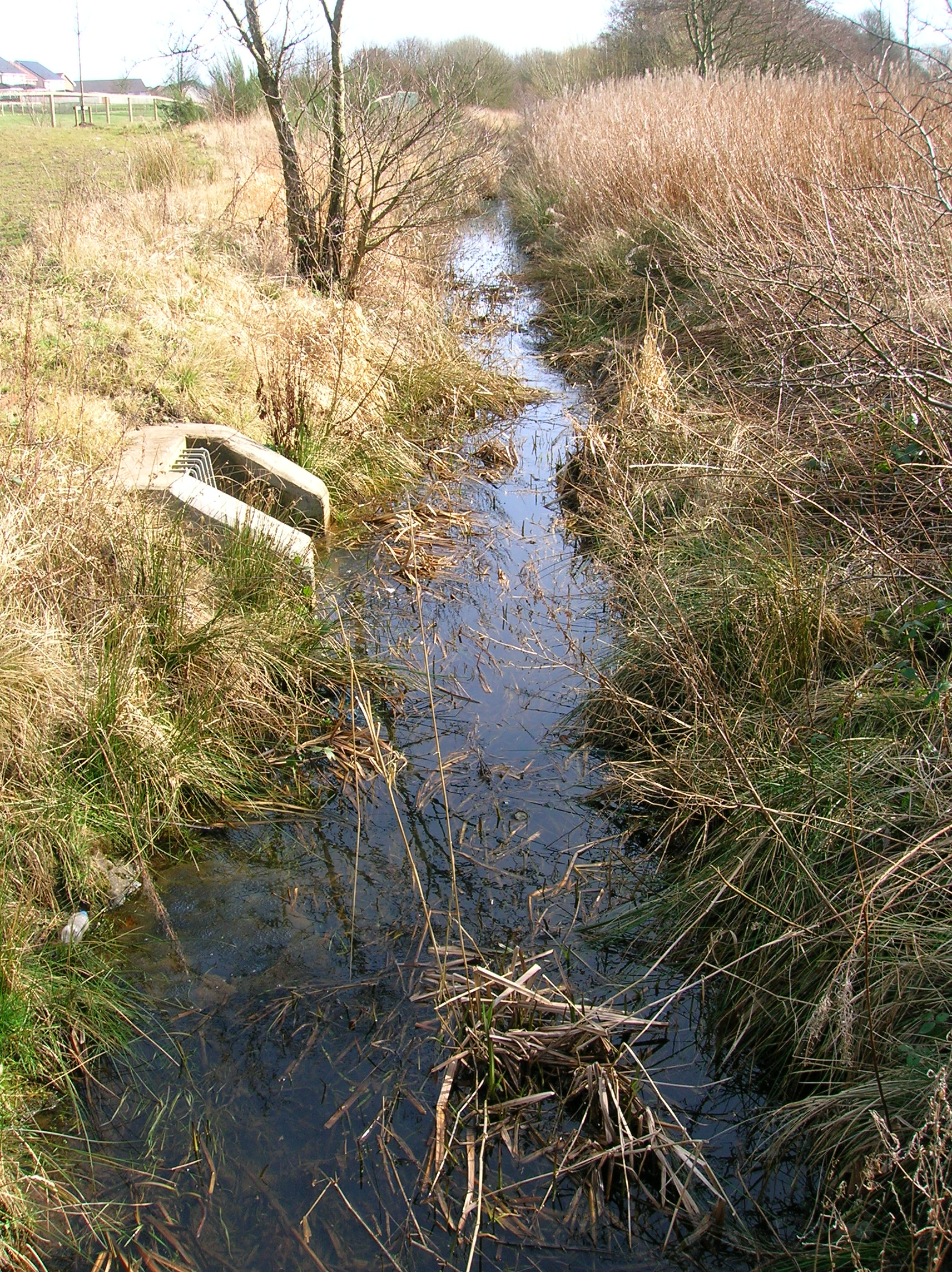
The Red burn in 2009 near the site of the Drukken Steps

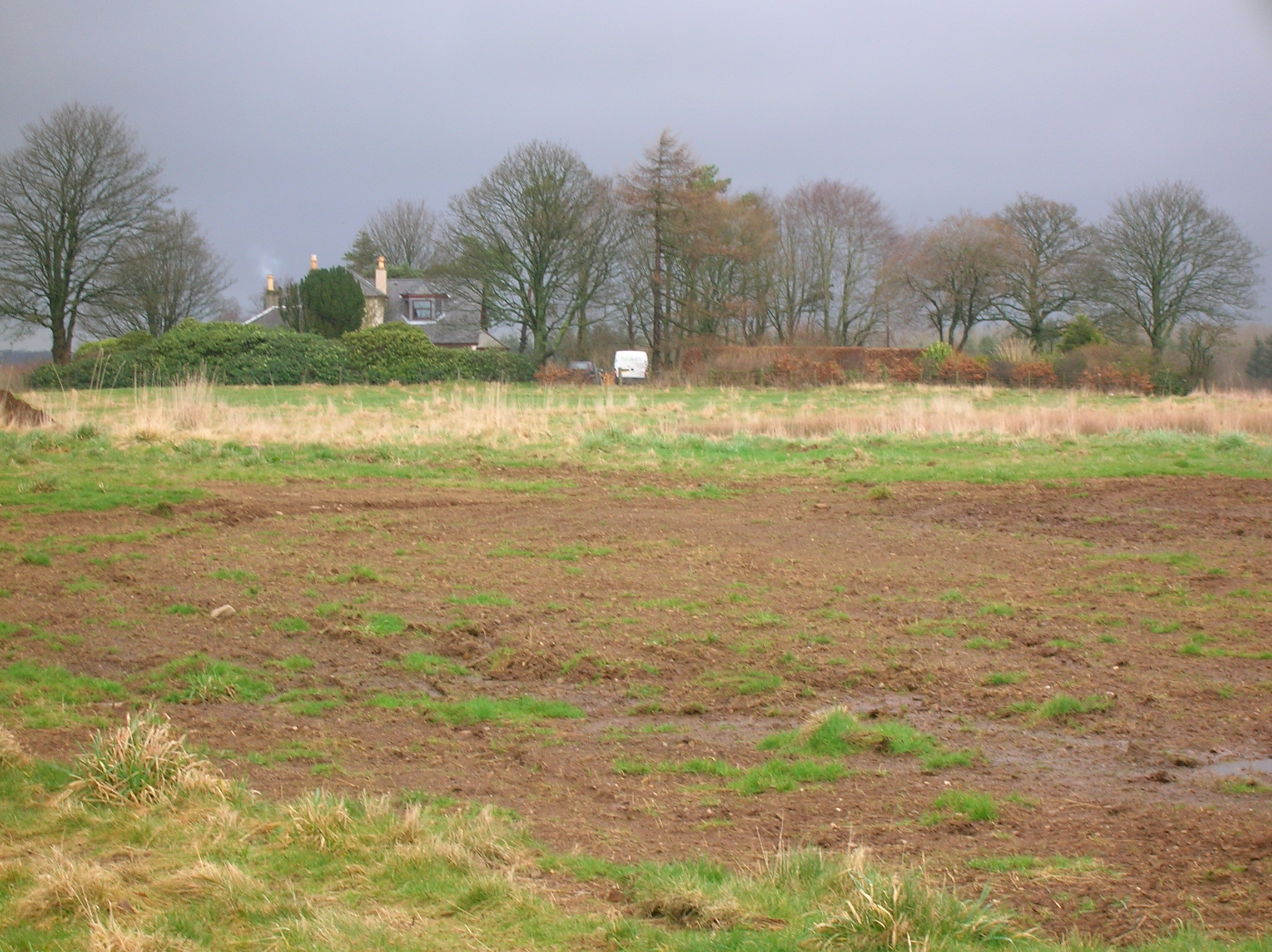
Gravel Cottage (now Morven Lodge) on the old 1774 toll road close to Higgins House

The Drukken Steps in the old Eglinton Woods near Stanecastle at NS 329 404, was a favourite haunt of Burns and Richard Brown whilst the two were in Irvine in 1781–82 and a commemorative cairn off Bank Street at MacKinnon Terrace, next to the expressway, is erroneously said to stand a few hundred yards from the site of the Drukken stepping stones across the Red Burn, also said to be the site of Saint Bryde's or Bride's well. Until recently, therefore, the Drukken Steps were thought to have been buried beneath the road surface.

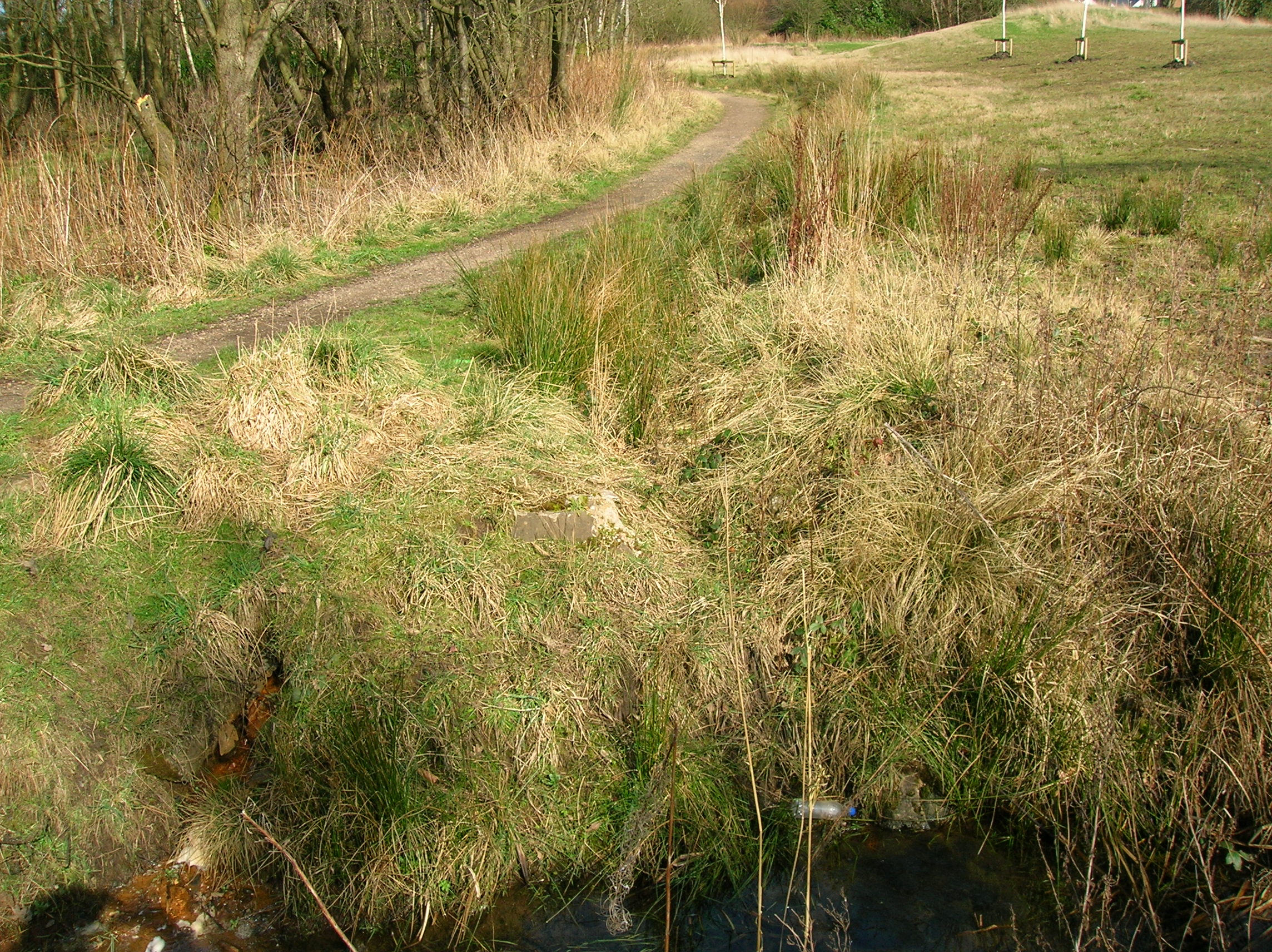
The 1960s bridge abutment at the site of the old Drukken Steps of circa 1966 with the old Toll Road route in the background

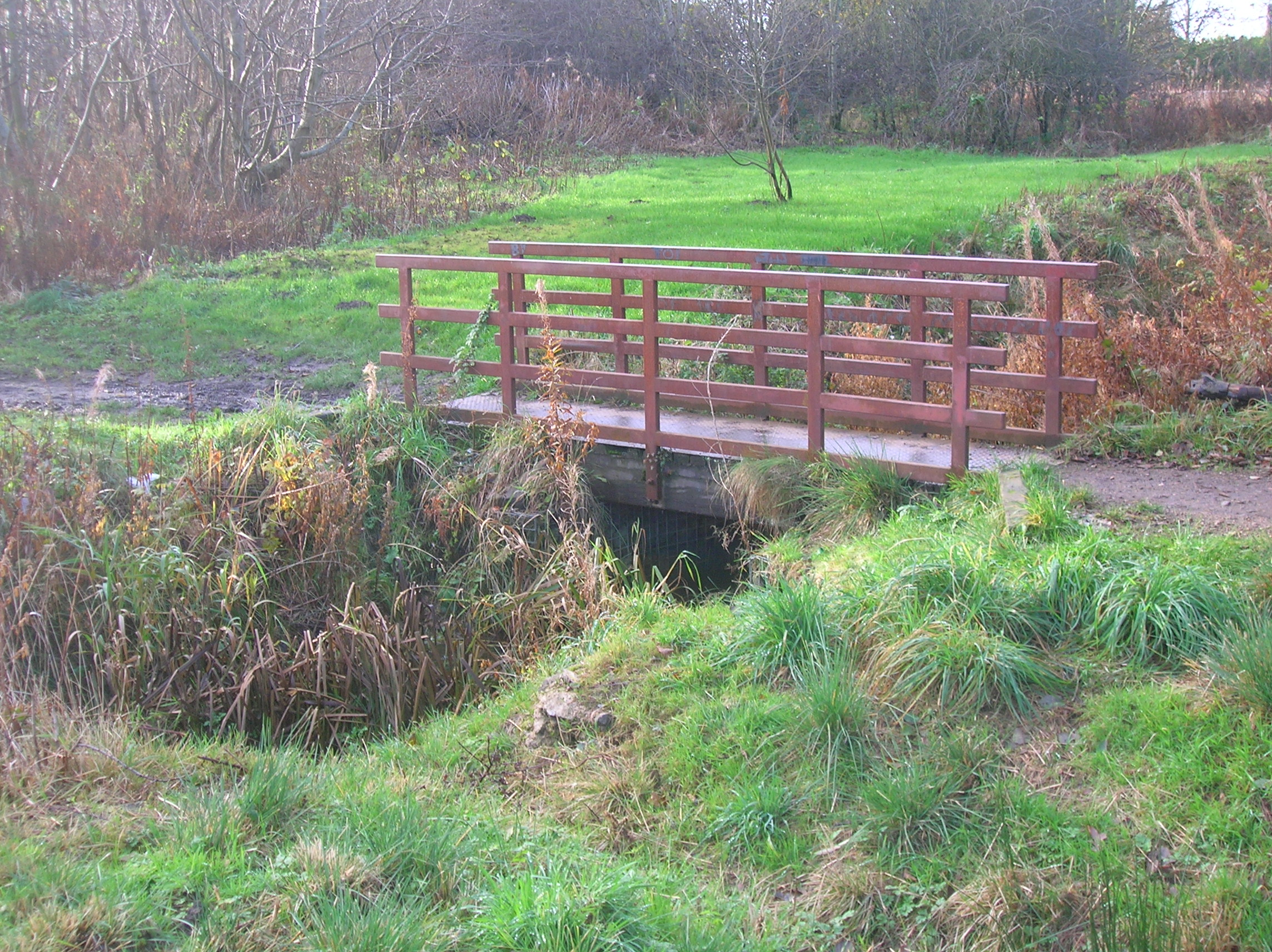
The site of the Drukken Steps over the Red Burn on the 1774 Toll road to Millburn via Higgens House

Richard Brown was Burns' closest friend in Irvine. Burns said of him : This gentleman's mind was fraught with courage, independence, magnanimity, and every noble manly virtue. I loved him, I admired him to a degree of enthusiasm; and I strove to imitate him. In some measure I succeeded: I had the pride before, but he taught it to flow in proper channels. His knowledge of the world was vastly superior to mine, and I was all attention to learn.

Others view of Richard Brown was less charitable, such as:That moral leper who spoke of illicit love with all the levity of a sailor. Gilbert Burns says of Robert's days in Irvine that he here contracted some acquaintances of a freer manner of thinking and living than he had been used to, whose society prepared him for overleaping the bounds of rigid virtue, which had hitherto restrained him. Robert himself stated that Brown's views on illicit love did me a mischief. When Brown heard of Burns's comments he exclaimed Illicit love! Levity of a sailor! When I first knew Burns he had nothing to learn in that respect.

The name 'Drukken' steps name derives from a person's gait as they stepped from stone to stone whilst crossing the burn. The Drukken Steps therefore were on the course of the old Toll Road in 1774, which ran from the west end of Irvine through the Eglinton policies to Kilwinning via Milnburn or Millburn; crossing the Red burn near Knadgerhill (previously Knadgar and pronounced 'Nygerhill' as in the country.) and running passed 'The Higgin's cottage, the 'Hygenhouse' of 1774, now demolished.55°37.902′N 004°39.355′W

In 1799, the Earl closed the road beyond the Drukken steps to 'protect' his new policies, providing a new road instead which ran via Knadgerhill.

Steps Road in Irvine commemorates the Drukken steps.

=== Higgin's House and the toll road ===
==== Views of the Higgin's House site in 2009 ====
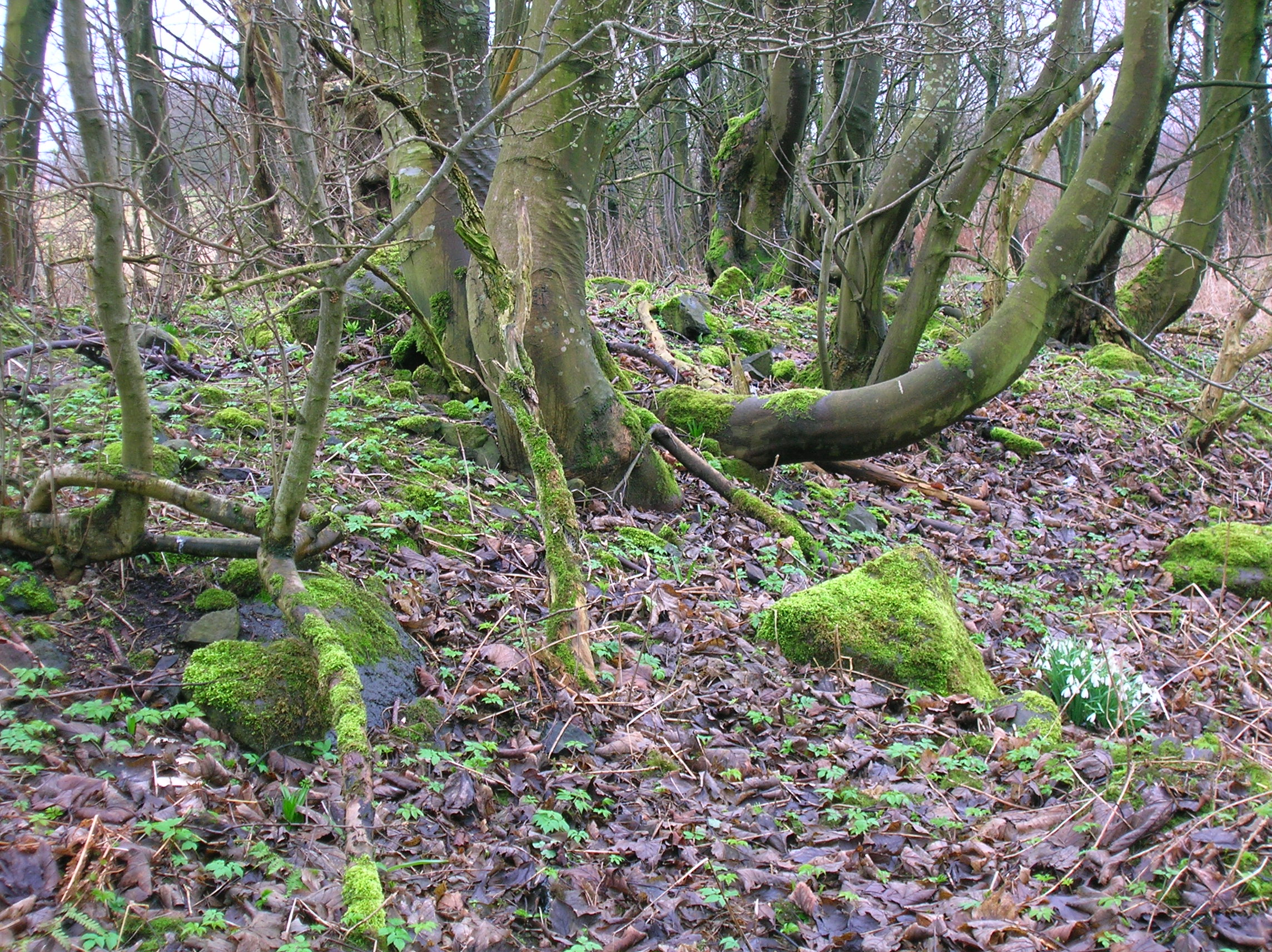
The ruins of Higgin's House on the old Toll Road near the Drukken steps

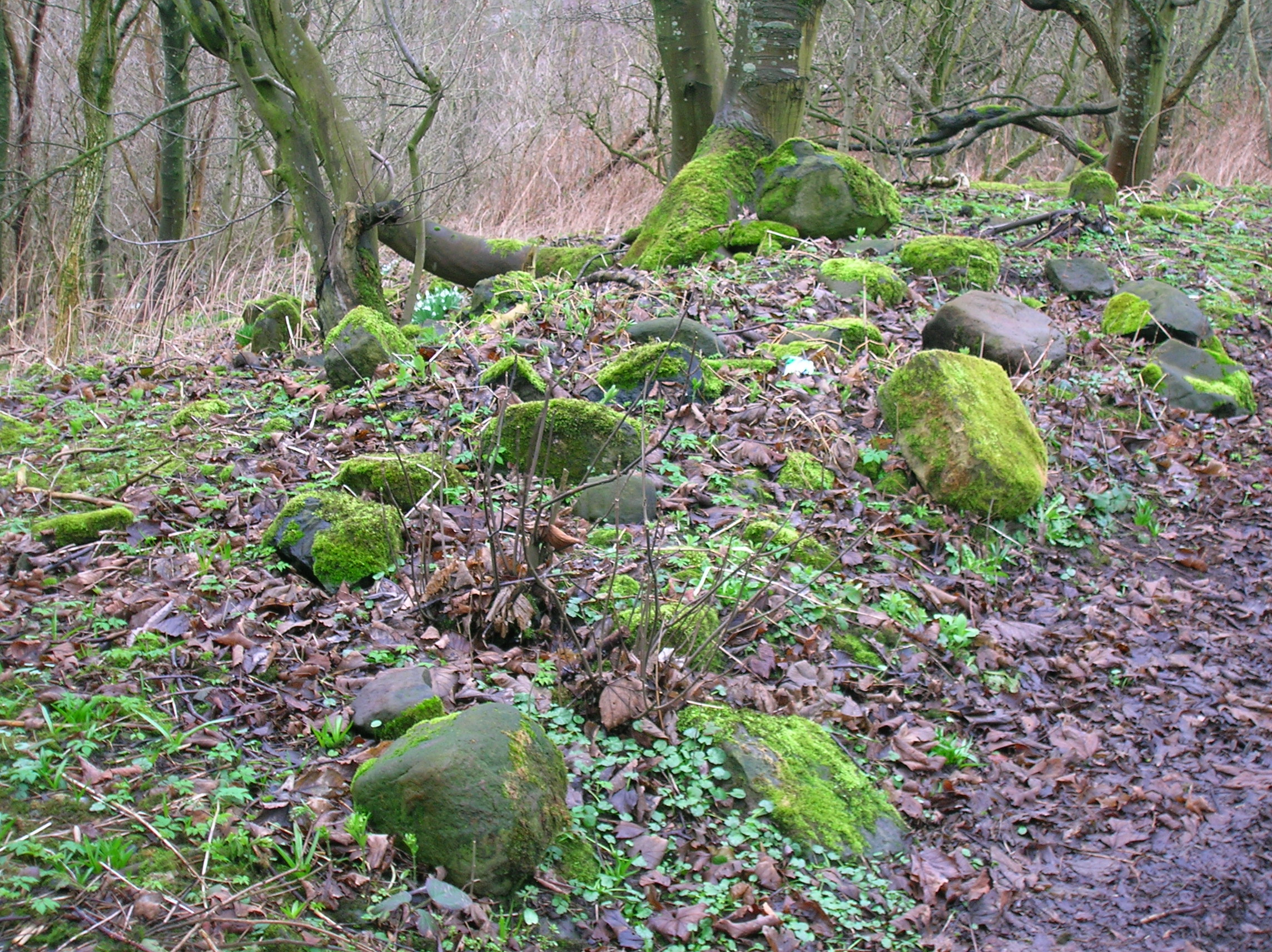
Higgin's House ruins, an old cottage once visited by Robert Burns and Richard Brown

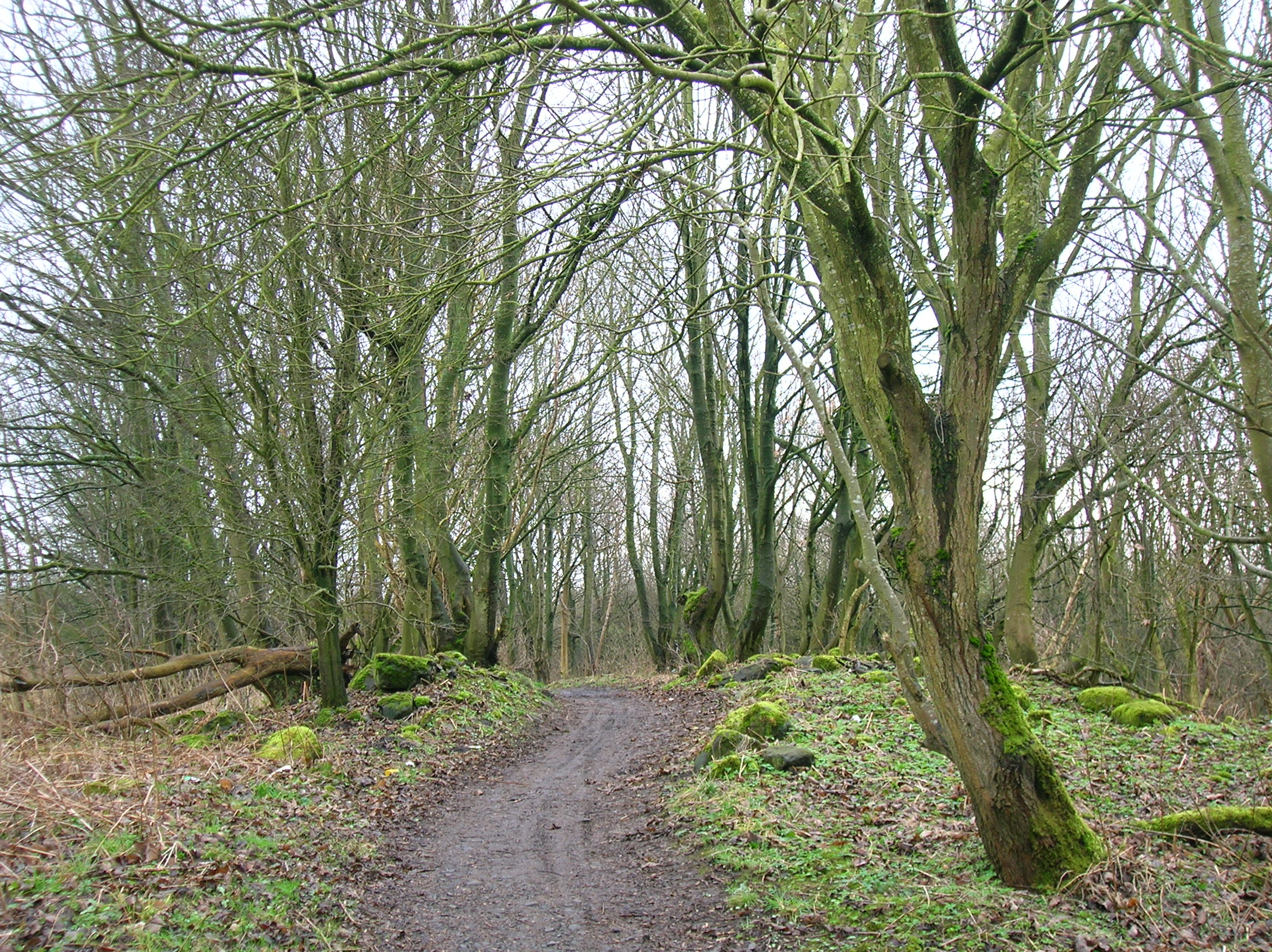
The old Toll road running passed the Higgin's House ruins

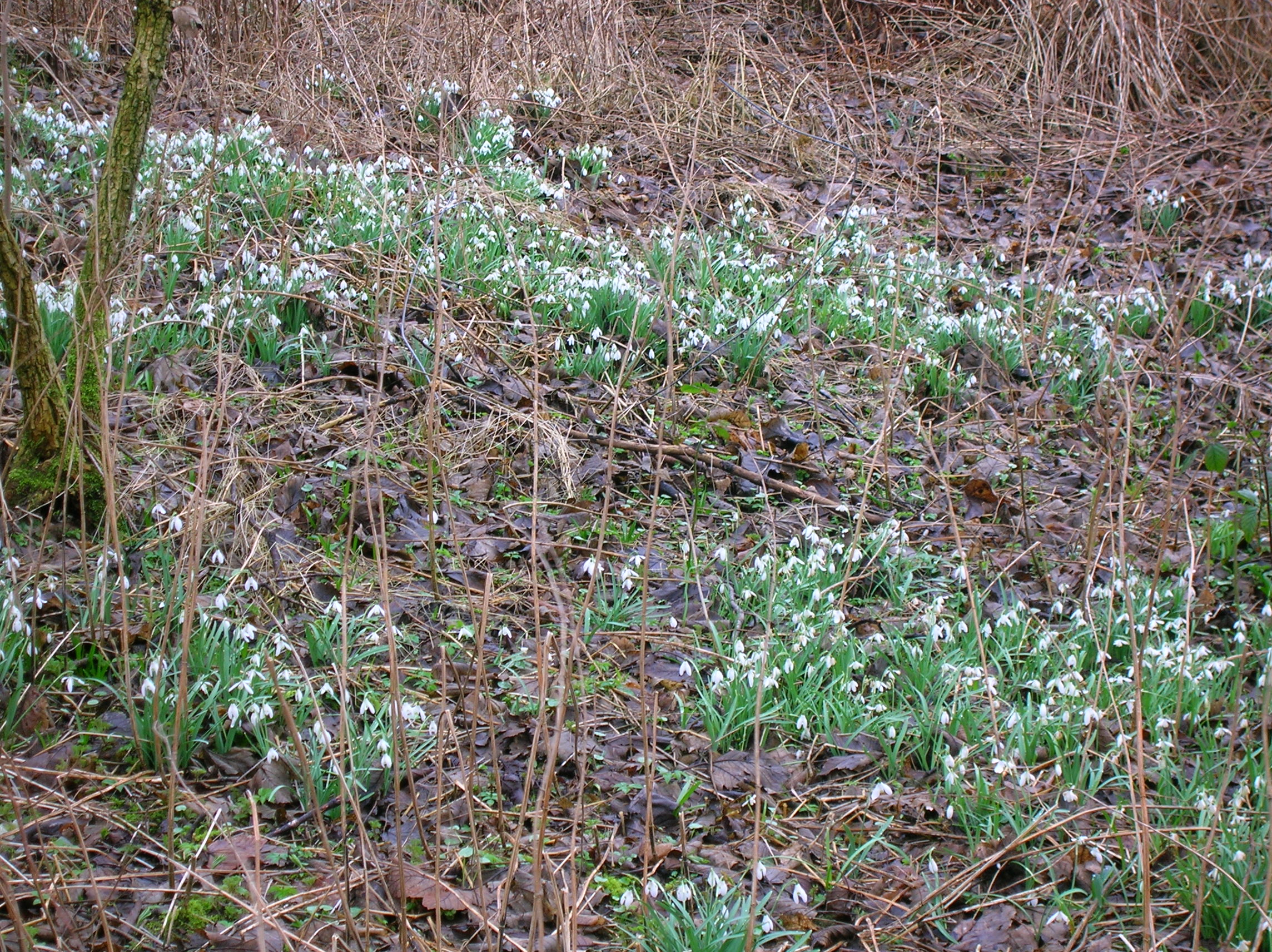
Drifts of Snowdrops and other plants show the antiquity of these woods

The Higgin's House (NS 32838 40791) section of the road is the only unaltered section where a visitor can literally walk in the footsteps of Burns and Richard Brown; the ancient and unspoiled nature of Higgin's House is highlighted by the swathes of snowdrops, bluebells, dog's mercury, pignut and other indicator plants of old woodland surrounding the site, plants not commonly found elsewhere in Irvine in such numbers and together in one place. Nettles and elder at Higgins are reliable indicators of past human occupation. The plaque on the commemorative cairn confirms that it was along this old road that Robert Burns and Richard Brown made their way through the woods of Eglinton.

== Clement Wilson and the Eglinton Burns statue ==
The gardens of Eglinton Country Park, established by the Clement Wilson Foundation, were graced by a fine Belgian 2' 6" statue of Burns, presented by Mr R Clement Wilson. The statue for many years had stood on a cairn between the old bowling green and the rhododendron maze; however, in 2009, it was moved to the Eglinton Country Park Visitor's Centre area for security reasons and to a site where more of the public will be able to appreciate it. It was stolen some years ago and on that occasion it was found unceremoniously dumped in the River Garnock.

R. Clement Wilson had found the statue in the showroom of antique dealers Deuchars of Perth. The statue had been stove-enamelled, however this had been removed and Mr Lindsay Aitkenhead, a Glasgow sculptor and teacher, took on the task of cleaning the statue. Mr. Aitkenhead also designed and built a plinth of hand-worked stone taken from Eglinton Castle.

== George Reid and Agnes Tennant of Barquharie ==
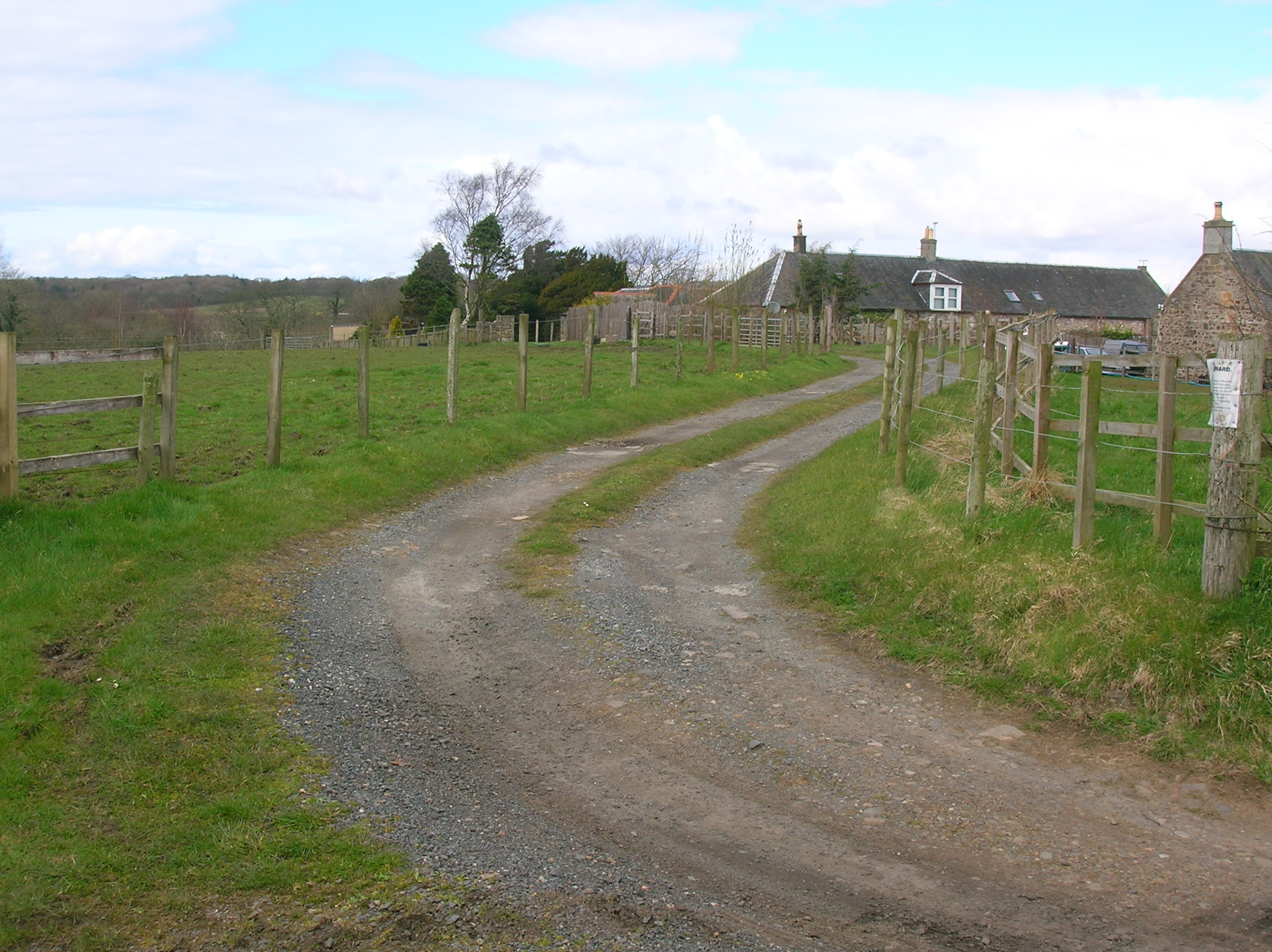
The old entrance to Fergushill House

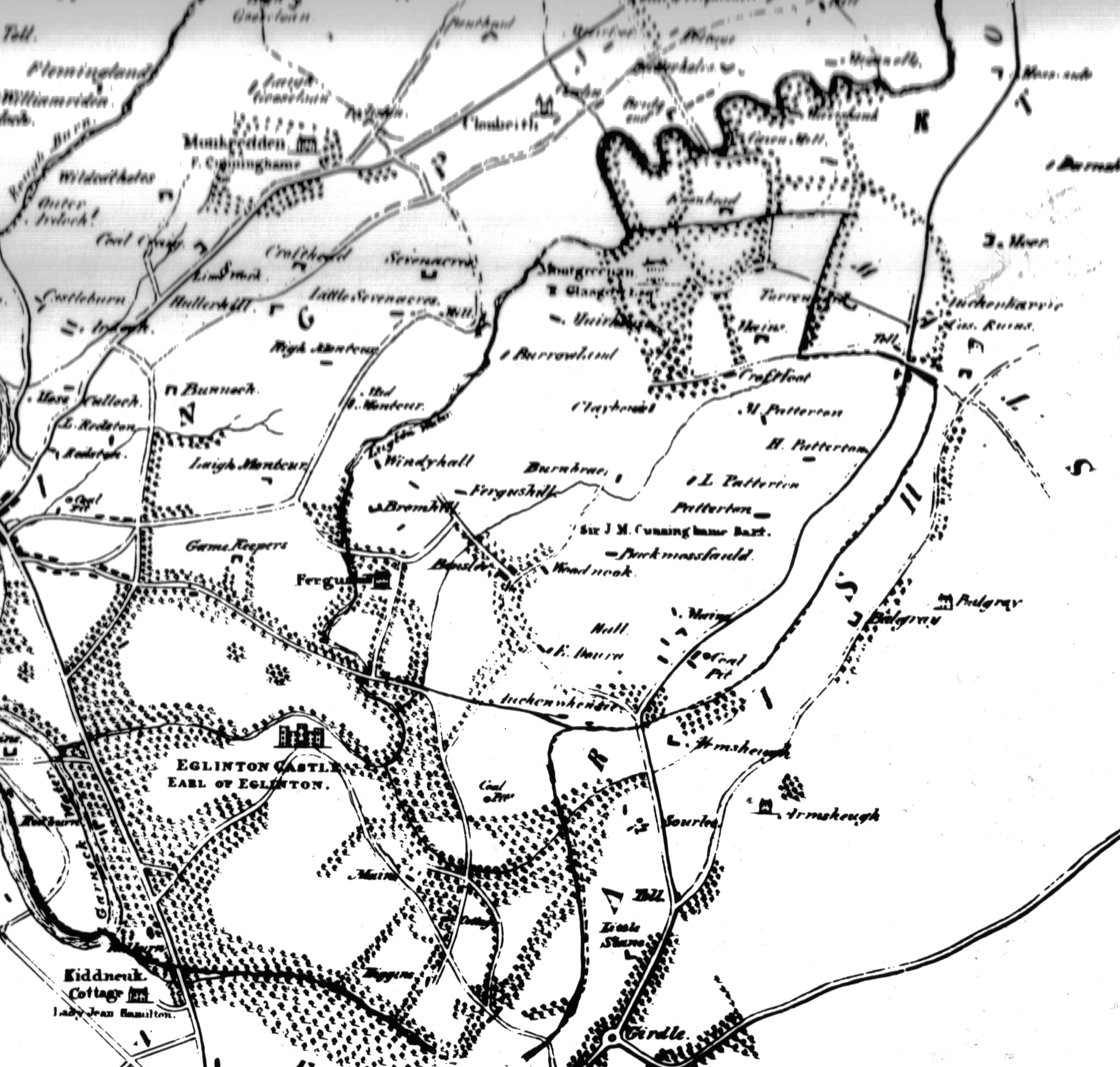
Aitken's 1823 map showing the position of Fergushill House, the old toll road and other details

George Reid (1762–1838) was originally a farmer at Barquharie or Barquharry near Ochiltree. In 1786 Burns borrowed Reid's pony to carry him to Edinburgh on 27 November 1786. Burns later wrote to thank him and to apologise for the late return of the pony returned by John Samson; he also sent Agnes Reid a copy of the Kilmarnock Edition. Through George Reid, Burns made the acquaintance of Mr. Prentice, the farmer of Cevington Mains, who testified his admiration for his poetry by subscribing for twelve copies of the second, Edinburgh edition.

Agnes Tennant was the eldest daughter of John Tennant of Glenconner, by his second marriage. She was George Reid's wife and is Burns' 'auld acquaintance, Nancy', in the 'Epistle to James Tennant'.

In 1803, George, this good friend of Robbie Burns, became the Eglinton Estate Factor for Hugh, the 12th Earl of Eglinton, and was given the use of Fergushill House as his residence. He was the factor at the time of the building of the new Eglinton Castle, gardens, bridges, etc. Fergushill House stood near the Lugton Water, close to South Fergushill Farm and the present day (2009) Fergushill cottage. Robin Cummell records that Reid was very fond of entertaining his many friends at Fergushill Hall, many of whom had also been friends of Robert Burns.

== Robin Cummel (Campbell) ==
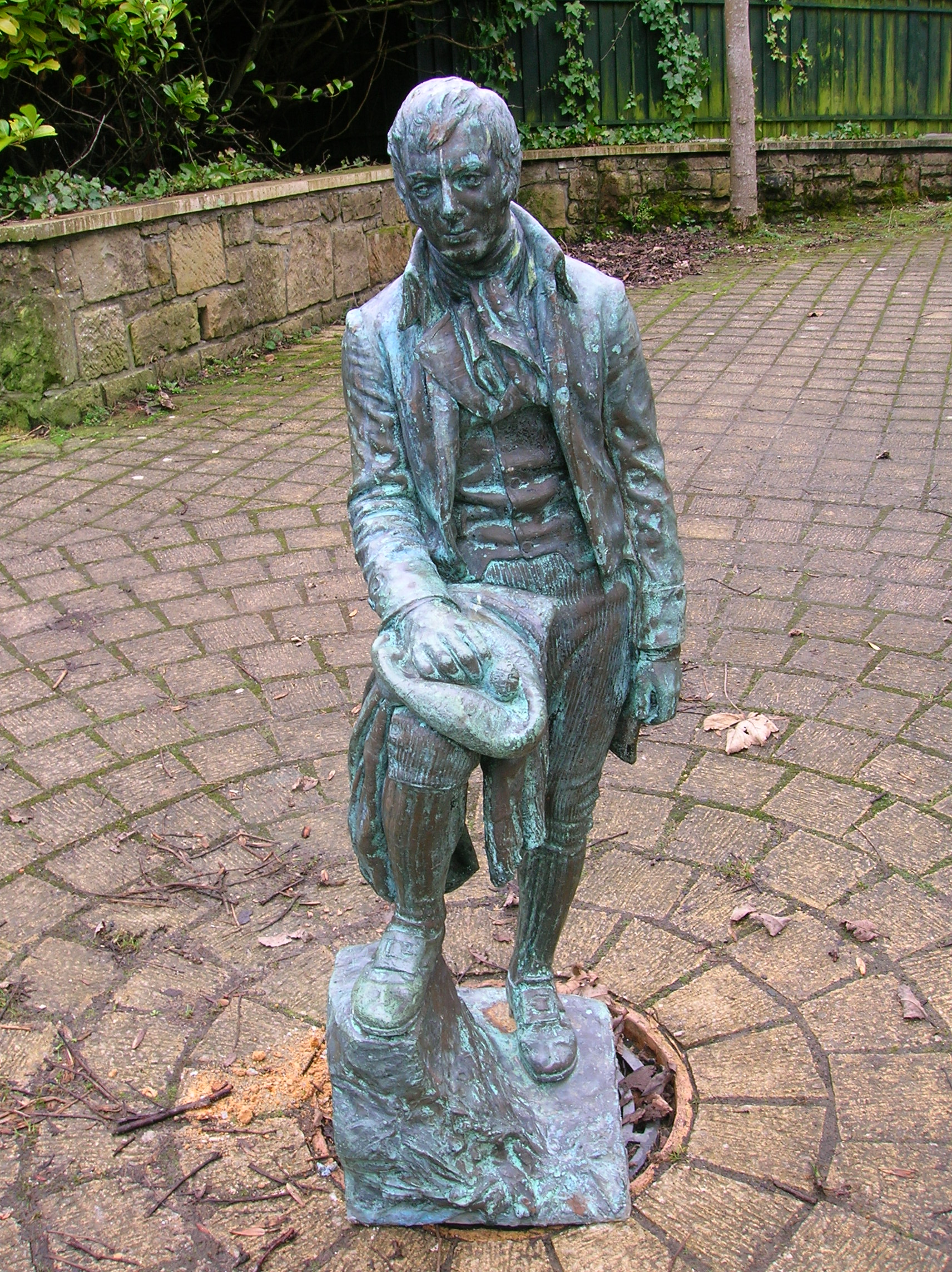
The statue of Robert Burns erected by Clement Wilson at Eglinton

In his semi-fictional book, John Service writes that Robin or Robert Cammell (Campbell in English), was a native of Kilwinning, born around 1745 and dying at the age of 95 in 1840. Robin worked for many years at Eglinton Castle and his recollections of Robert Burns and his memories of the estate and district were published in book form under the title The Memorables of Robin Cummell. Robin records that he knew Burns well and regularly met him, Richard Brown, Keelivine (a lawyer), and Tammy Struggles (a nickname) at the Wheatsheaf Inn in Irvine High Street. The name 'Keelivine' means 'Lead pencil' in Lallans, an appropriate sobriquet for a lawyer's clerk.

Robin was in the group who had accompanied the 10th Earl of Eglinton on that fateful morning of 24 October 1769 when the earl was mortally wounded at Ardrossan by gauger Mungo Campbell. Robin wrote an eyewitness account of the incident that still survives in the Memorables of Robin Cummell. Before he died, the earl gave Robin one of the sixth earl's pistols; this earl had the nickname 'Graysteel' in recognition of his great courage.

== Charles Fleming ==
During his time in Irvine Robert was unwell and was treated by Charles Fleming whose day-book recording the treatments survives and is in the possession of the Irvine Burns Club. Charles Fleming died aged 89, circa 1809. He was at first a surgeon in the Royal Navy and upon retirement from the navy he lived in Irvine where he married Rebecca Montgomery, heiress of William Montgomery of Montgomery-field and inherited this property through his wife. He had a daughter Rebecca who married David, son of Patrick Hunter of Hunterston.

The Scots Magazine records of Charles Fleming that Few men have maintained such a uniform excellency of character as this venerable old gentlemen did through the course of a long life.

== Robert Burns ==
In the 1881 Census records a Robert Burns is listed as living with his family of six at Dykehead Lodge; he also had a son Robert. Robert was a master blacksmith, in charge of a staff of three at the estate smithy.

== John MacKenzie ==
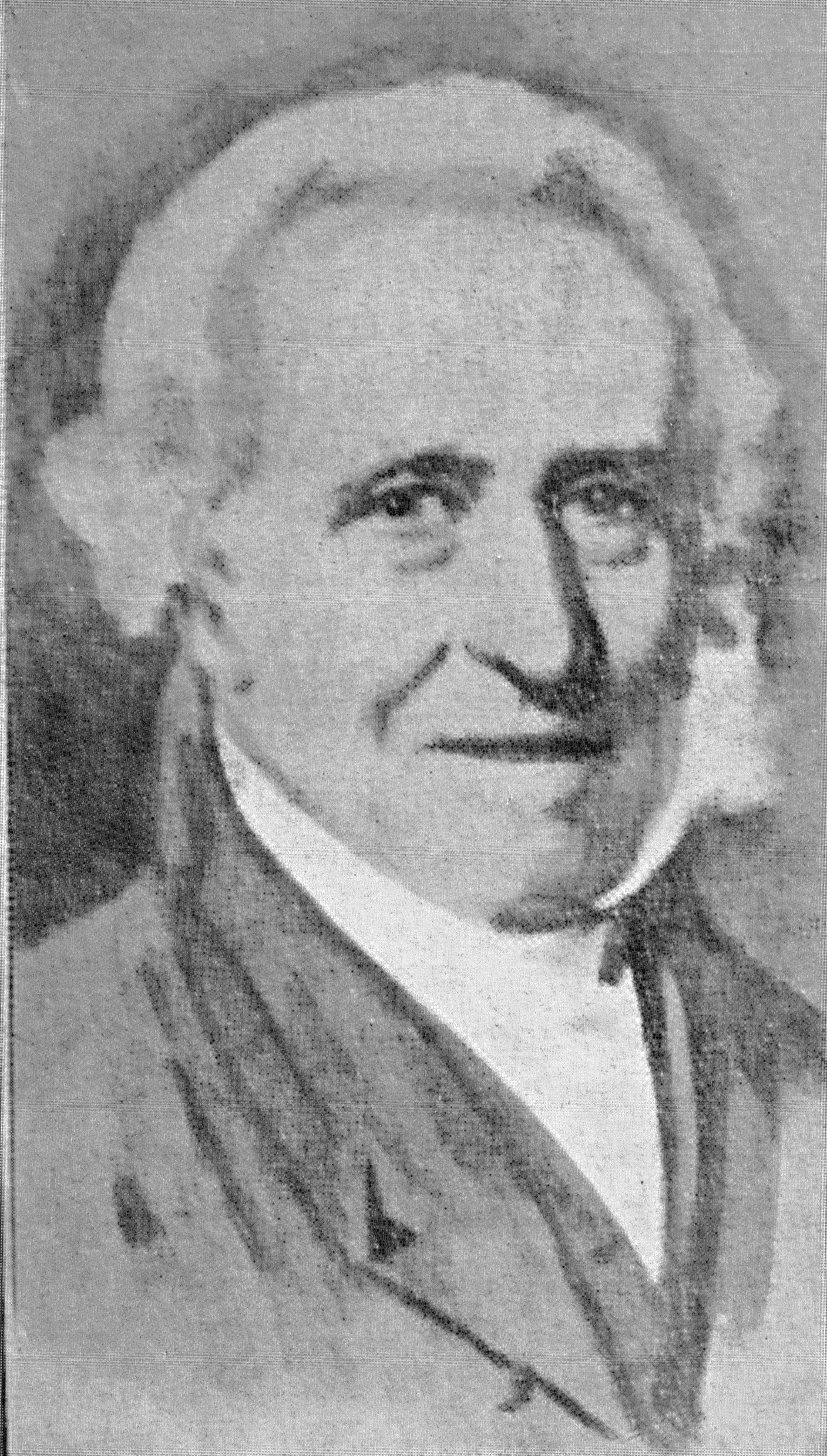
John MacKenzie of Mauchline

In 1801, the 12th Earl of Eglinton, Hugh Montgomerie, persuaded John MacKenzie to move from Mauchline to Irvine and live free of rent for life at Seagate House. In return, he acted as the Montgomerie's family doctor, retained at an annuity of £130 in full payment for his professional services. John MacKenzie had been Robert Burns' family doctor in his Mauchline days as well as a friend, patron and admirer of the poet's genius. MacKenzie was the first Chairman of the Irvine Burns Club in 1826.

== John Peebles ==
John had been an adjutant to the 11th Earl of Eglinton, a founder member of the Irvine Burns Club, and he claimed to have known Robert Burns well.

== Alison Begbie ==
Burns was probably rejected in a proposal of marriage to Alison Begbie shortly before he came to live in irvine and this may have been a significant contributing factor to the depressive illness that he suffered at the time.

== Jean Gardner ==
Jean Gardner lived in the Seagate at Irvine and is said to have been a close friend. She later became a Buchanite and left the town to live at New Cample and later Crocketford.

== Jean Glover ==
Jean Glover is said to have had a brief affair with Robert Burns. She was a travelling entertainer and Burns certainly recorded a song that she performed and sent it to be published.

== Portrayal on Coins ==
In 1996 the Pobjoy Mint produced a set of four one Crown denomination coins for the Isle of Man Government to celebrate Bicentennial of the death of Robert Burns. One of these coins shows Robert Burns writing poetry in the woods at Eglinton. The image is based on the murals of Robert Burns by Ted and Elizabeth Odling that are located at the Irvine Burns Club.

== See also ==
- Eglinton Castle
- Earl of Eglinton
- Eglinton Country Park
