= Industry and the Eglinton Castle estate =

Village in North Ayrshire, Scotland, UK

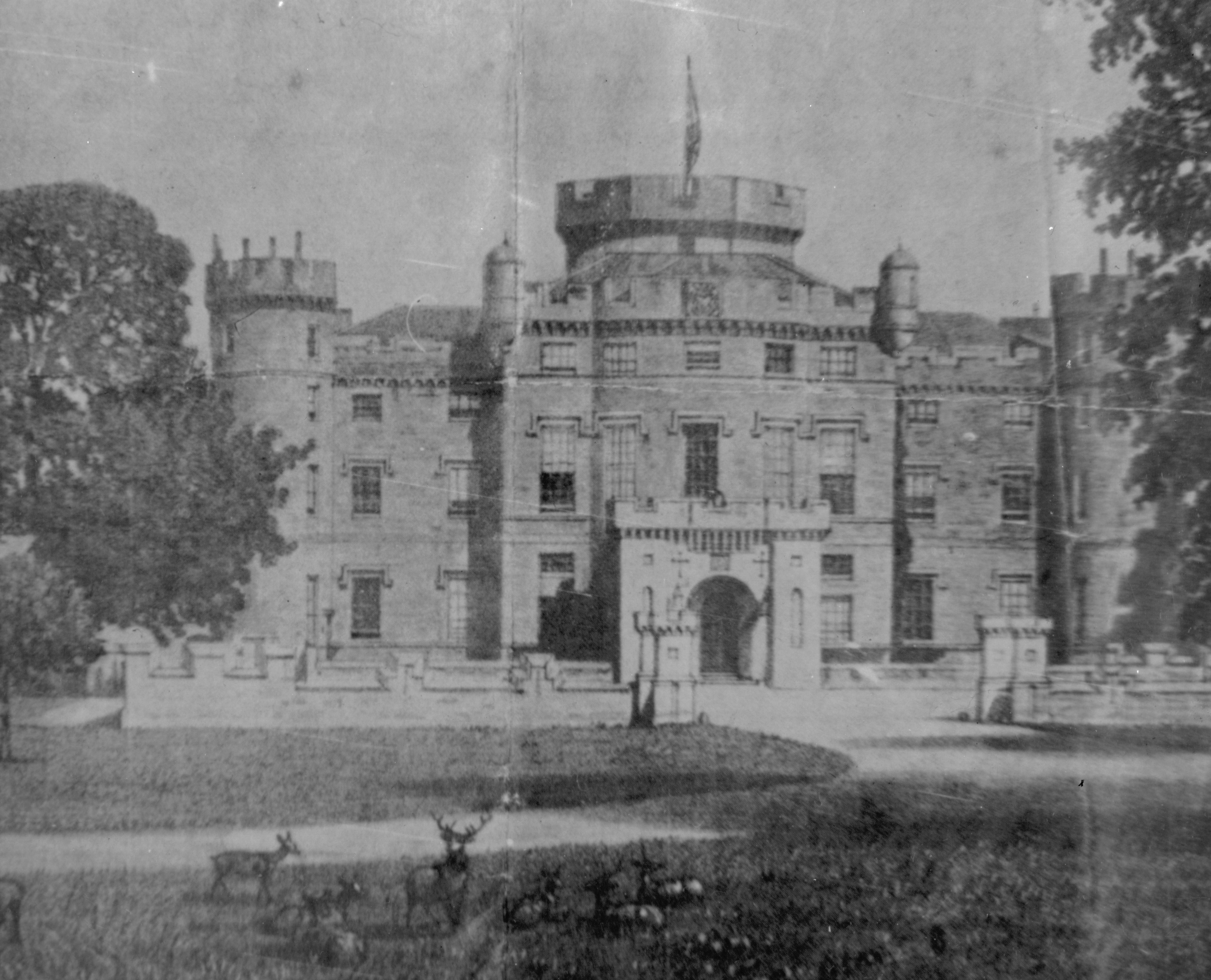
Eglinton castle circa 1870, with deer grazing in the foreground

The Eglinton Castle estate was situated at Irvine, on the outskirts of Kilwinning, North Ayrshire, Scotland (map reference NS 3227 42200) in the former district of Cunninghame. Eglinton Castle, was once home to the Montgomeries, Earls of Eglinton and chiefs of the Clan Montgomery. Eglinton Country Park now occupies part of the site.

A dense network of mineral railway lines existed in the 19th and 20th centuries; the trackbed now being used as cycle paths in several places. A complex set of collieries, coal pits, tile works, fire-clay works and workers villages are evident from records such as OS maps. Little now remains of the buildings and railway lines, apart from at Lady Ha' Colliery, but irregular depressions in the ground, embankments, cuttings, coal bings and abandoned bridges all bear witness to what was at one time a very active coalfield with associated industries and infrastructure.

== Oil ==
In the 1860s records for the Perceton freight line show that shale oil was being transported from Fergushill pit to West Lothian.

== Coal mining ==
=== The coal seams ===
McMichael records that nine coal seams underlie the Parish of Kilwinning, their names and dimensions from top to bottom being : Five-quarter coal, 2 feet 11 inches (0.89 m); parrot coal, 2 feet 4 inches (0.71 m); turf coal, 2 feet 4 inches (0.71 m); wee coal, No.1, 2 feet 2 inches (0.66 m); lady ha' coal, 2 feet 2 inches (0.66 m); ell coal, 2 feet 3 inches (0.69 m); stone coal, 2 feet 4 inches (0.71 m); wee coal No.2, 2 feet (0.61 m); and main coal, 3 feet (0.91 m).

=== Early coal exploration in the area ===
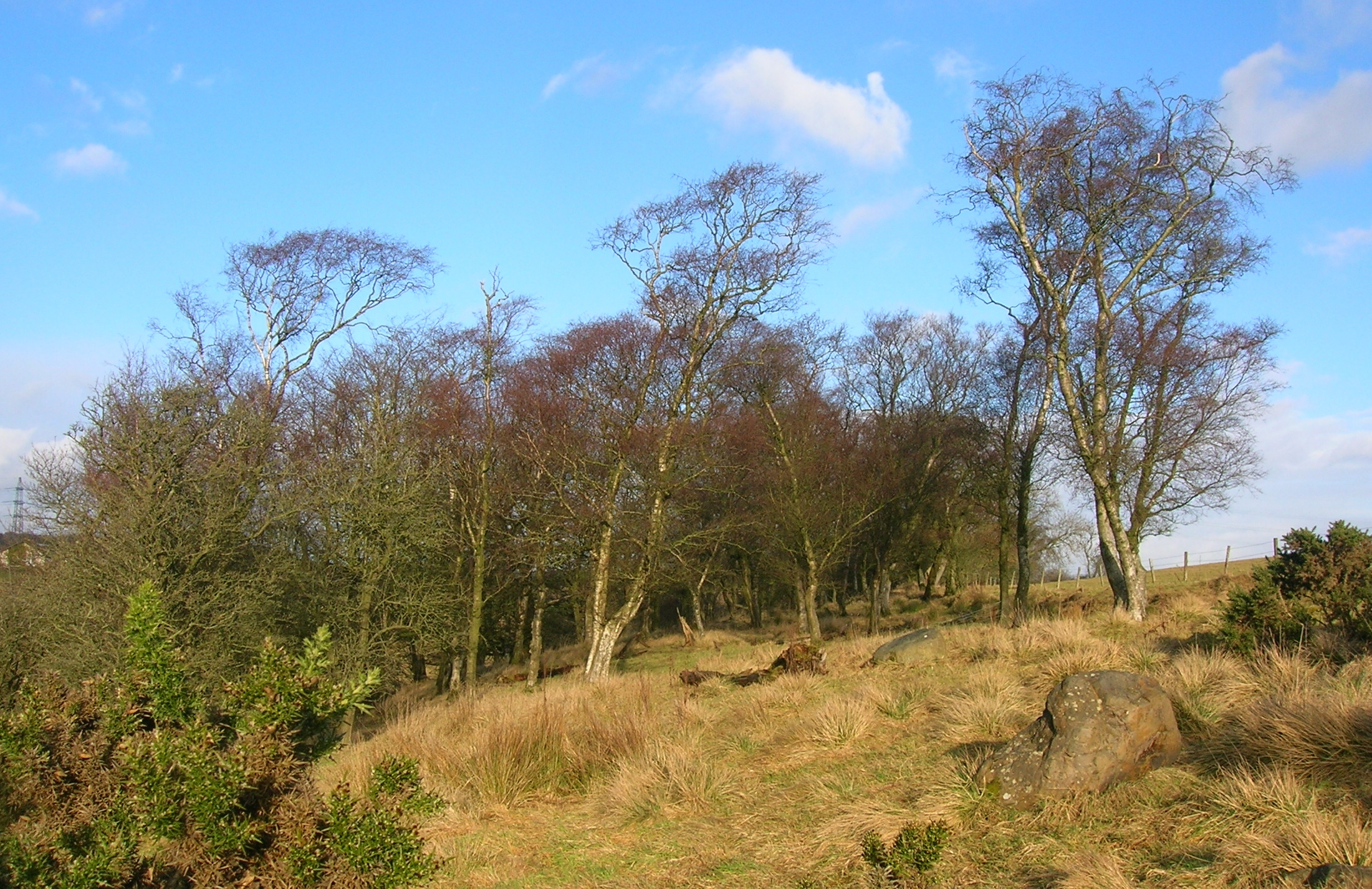
Doura Wood, the site of the Doura Coal mine and pits.

Apart from direct involvement in the provision of coal from their own estates the earls provided loans to others, such as to Robert Cunninghame of Auchenharvie who developed extensive coal mining operations in the Barony of Stevenston. The results were variable, however the Earls did obtain some new lands, rents, tolls and other benefits.

The earliest form of coal mining was at what was called adits or in Scotland, 'ingaun e'es' (ingoing eyes), in which exposed coal was mined through the coal seam itself. These were typically in places such as valleys where erosion had exposed the coal veins.

At first in the 16th century, peat, charcoal or timber were the preferred fuels and only when they were in short supply was coal actively sought. The Eglinton Estate papers record details of tenants petitioning for coal to be provided, however the cost involved and the farmers lack of ability to pay often made such mining uneconomic. In the 17th century dwindling supplies of other fuels and demand from developing towns in Ireland led to coal mining becoming economically viable and sometimes highly remunerative.

The Doura pits had been worked at the time of Mary Queen of Scots (1542–1587), when they had supplied coal to the Palace of Holyrood and Edinburgh Castle. It was later abandoned on being flooded. This is not as unlikely as it seems because the mining methods of the time had exhausted the known accessible coal stocks and that their existed an "exhorbitant dearth and scantness of fewale within the Realme". In the 18th century and before, Dowra (sic), was a 'household word' in the district due to the excellent quality of the coal it produced.

Coal workings and wastes at Monkridding near Kilwinning were recorded by Timothy Pont in 1608, extending between 50 and 100 acres (0.40 km^{2}), associated with the limestone.

In the 1660s coal mining activities intensified on the Eglinton estates, partly to supply the needs of the Irish who had none. Coal heughs were shallow pits and in 1686 they had been sunk at Doura and Armsheugh, the coal being taken down to Irvine via the Drukken Steps or via Stanecastle.

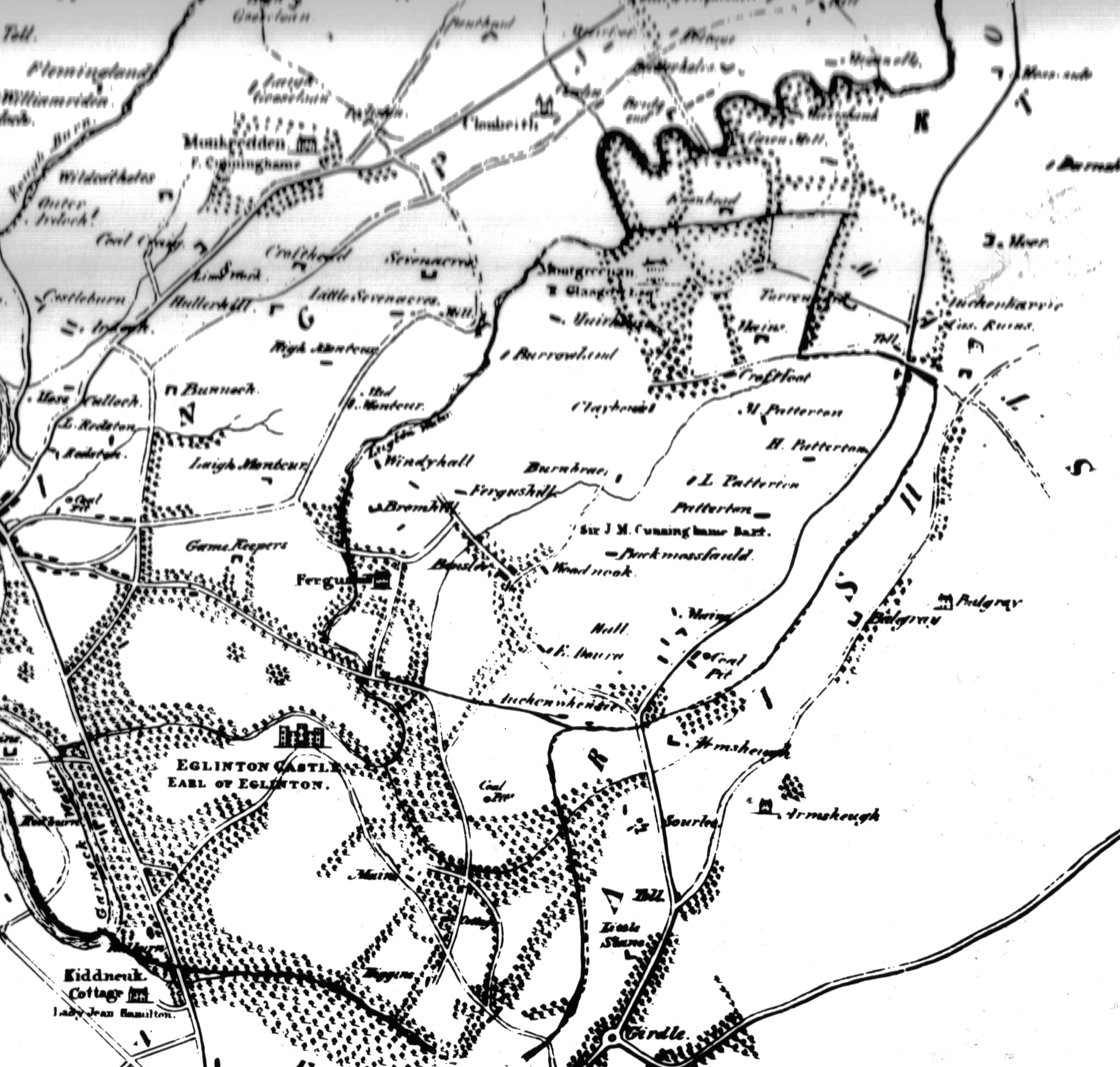
The Eglinton, Benslie and Fergushill areas in 1823 with coal pits marked

The Earls demanded extremely high rents for their coal mines and they did not work the Fergushill pits as they were required for the 'use of the House of Eglinton'. This policy may have been to conserve their coal supplies and it resulted in high prices and a shortage.

Charles Sherriff was sub-factor to the 10th Earl between 1759 and 1761 and coal manager during the 1760s. At Fergushill Provost William McTaggart paid £2000 Scots for twenty coal hewers in the 18th century.

In 1771 the Earl had a pit and feued an 'avenue from the Circle at the Mains down to the river' from Irvine Burgh. He had permission to build roads, waggonways, breastworks, and coal rees on the river side.

In 1808 William Aiton recorded coal mining at Eglinton, Doura, and Sourlie.

John Smith in 1895 records "the remains of an old lade, which supplied water to drive a wheel wherewith the old coal-pits used to be drained." This was an early example of the use of water-gins (water-wheels) to help drain mines.

The Eglinton Colliery was the main centre for the earls coal operations in the 18th century, however it was flooded when miners broke into old waste at Fergushill in 1747; Millburn Colliery was also operated at this time. 28 hewers were employed at the time. Agents worked Redburn and Fergushill until these were laid up in 1790.

In 1872 the 14th Earl, Archibald William, took in £9,500 a year from mineral royalties, around £900,000 in modern terms (2009); he collected an additional £37,000 a year from rents, worth around £2,500,000 in 2009.

=== Coal pits ===
Many of the small pits were mined and formed by the bell pit method which had a vertical shaft, followed by the horizontal removal of coal and finally an infilling with material from another bell pit. Eventually these partly back-filled pits collapsed and formed dry or more usually flooded bell shaped pits; this method ofmining was only possible where coal was close to the surface. The term pit continued to be used for more complex mining sites and generally referred to each shaft.

The 10th Earl had sunk bell pits in Kyleshill Street in Saltcoats in 1759-60. The wives and daughters had carried out the coal hewed by the men up ladders on their backs. A local poet had written:

Sair back and sair bones
Trudgin' mony a mile
Sad is the darg o'women folks
On the weary Hill o'Kyle.

A Dr. Duguid was the doctor for the Doura pit in the 18th century and recorded that when the flooded pit was drained, William Ralston, the ganger, found the old workmen's tools and their bones at the coal face. In the 18th century another disaster took place at Doura after heavy frosts had loosened the pit soil and the pit supports gave way. Pate Brogildy from the Redboiler survived, however he later had his arm ripped off at the shoulder blade by the flywheel of the pit steam engine. He survived as the twisting motion of the 'amputation' had sealed the arteries. Willie Forgisal (Fergushill?) of Torranyard had his leg amputated above the knee. James Jamphrey from Corsehill was killed instantly.

A William Forgisal (Fergushill) of Torranyard was a miner at the Doura Pit in the 18th century. He lost his leg in a mining accident, as had his father. William's wife was a tough sort, her comment being on seeing him so encumbered, was that the Forgisals would need a small plantation of their own to keep them in crutches.

The Statistical Account records that the coals at Doura were ell and stone-coals. Easter Doura mine employed 12 – 16 colliers and was owned by Lord Lisle and was leased by him for £140 per annum in the 18th century.

In 1725 the Earl of Eglinton was granted a 57 year tack from Patrick Warner to work coal within the lands of Dovecothall (Ardeer) and Piperheugh. In 1774 Patrick Warner and Robert Reid Cunningham signed a mutual agreement to work coal on the lands of Ardeer and Pyperheugh (sic).

John and George Taylor, sons of a lawyer, are recorded as having held leases for coal mines at Bartonholm and Doura in the early 19th century.

The Corsehillmuir pits were located near Corsehillhead and Five roads; a number of other pits were located nearby and at Buckreddan, off the Bannoch road. Moncur pit was rail served and located near Mid Moncur farm. Numerous coal pits were present in the Doura, Benslie, Auchenwinsey and Sourlie areas.

Coal pits were located ar Redburn near Redburn House and at Dykehead near the confluence of the Garnock and the Lugton Water. These pits were joined to the rail network via the line at Dirrans.

In 1856 a pit was located at South Millburn with an associated pit cottage, however by 1881 the pit had closed. The levelled bing or spoil heap is still apparent in the nearby field.

=== Eglinton Collieries ===
The 1856 OS map shows 28 pits in the vicinity of Irvine, but only 12 by 1874.

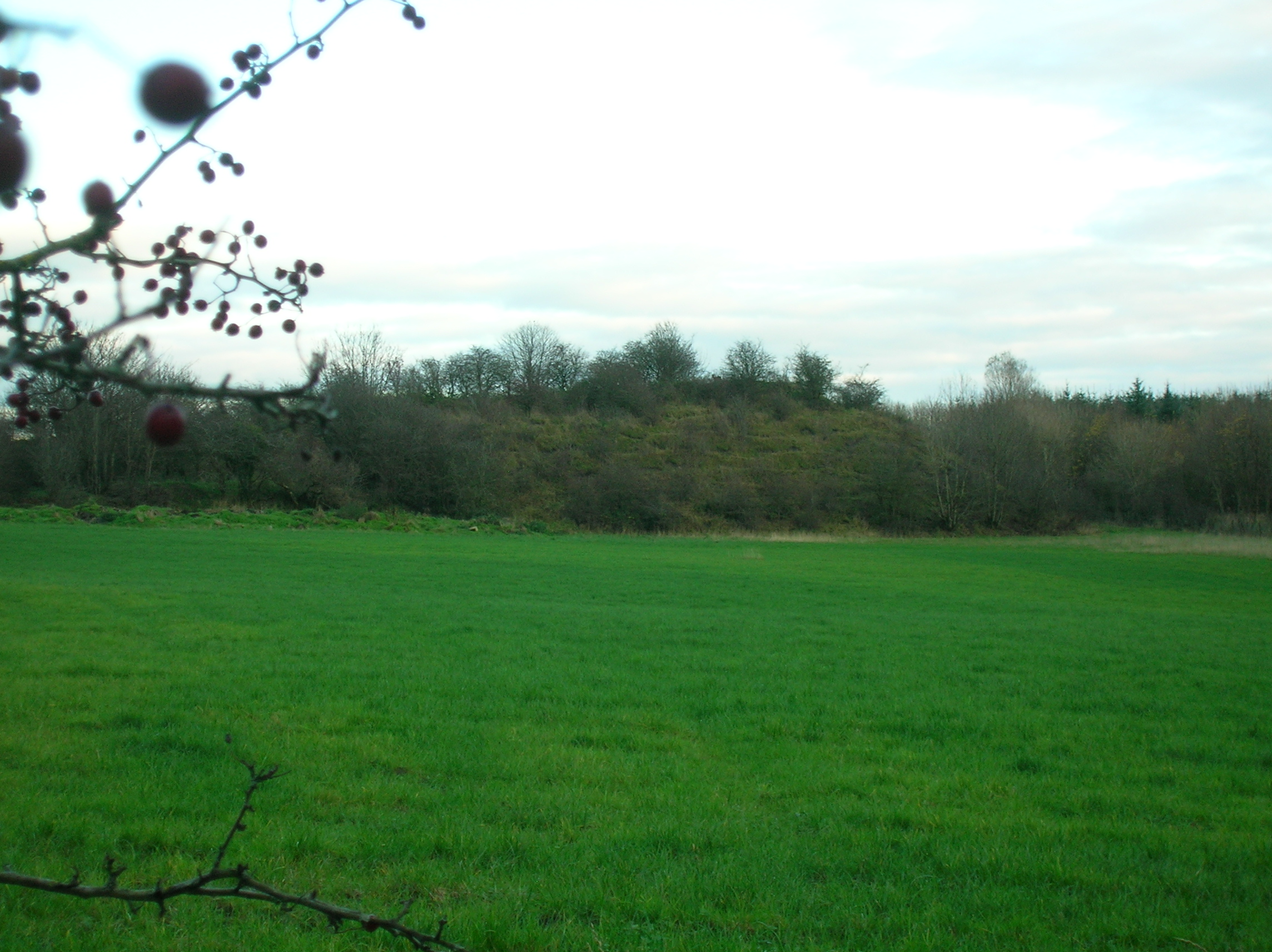
Moncur no 4 & 5 pit bing

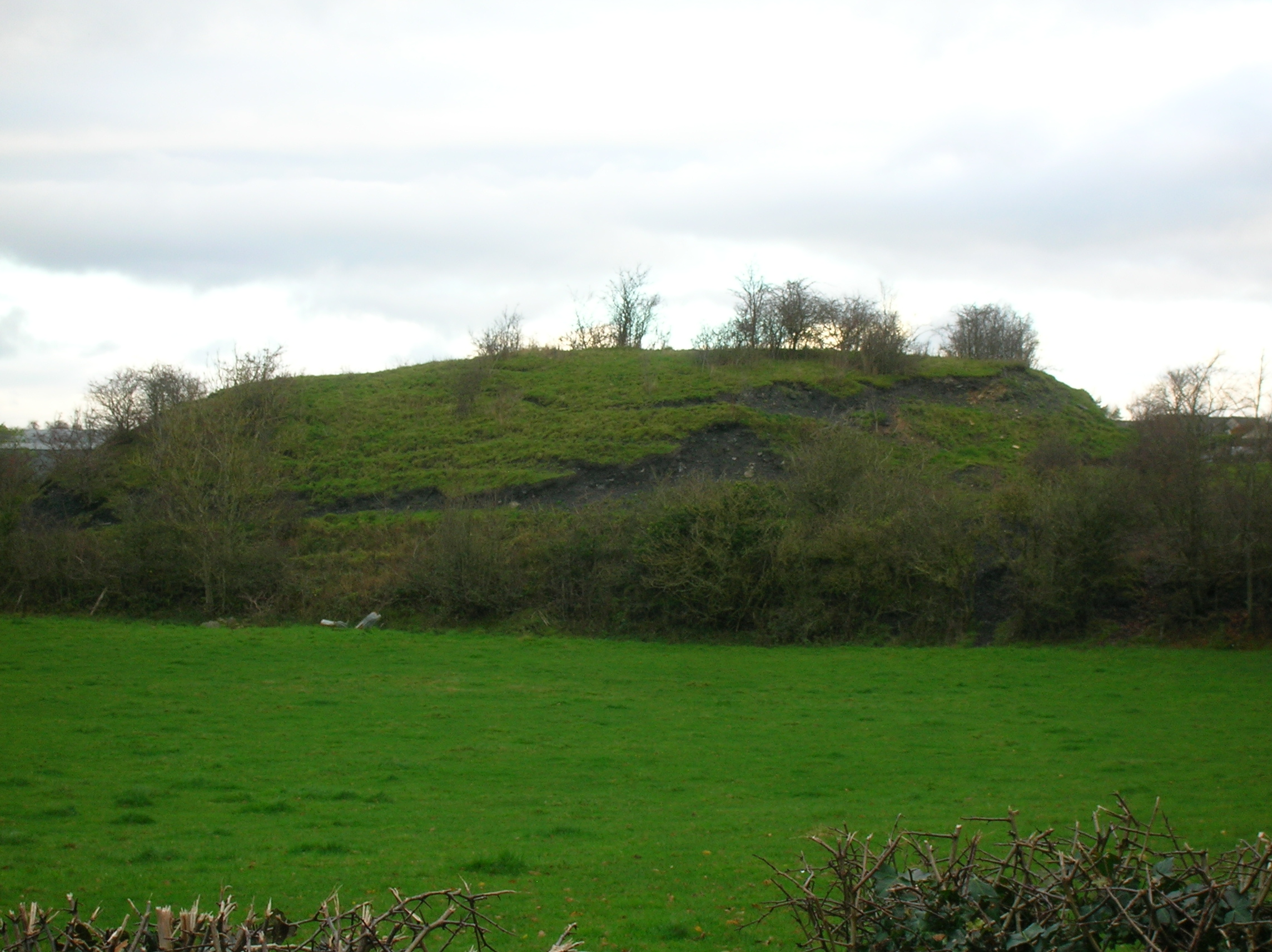
Fergushill no 23, 'The Holm' pit bing

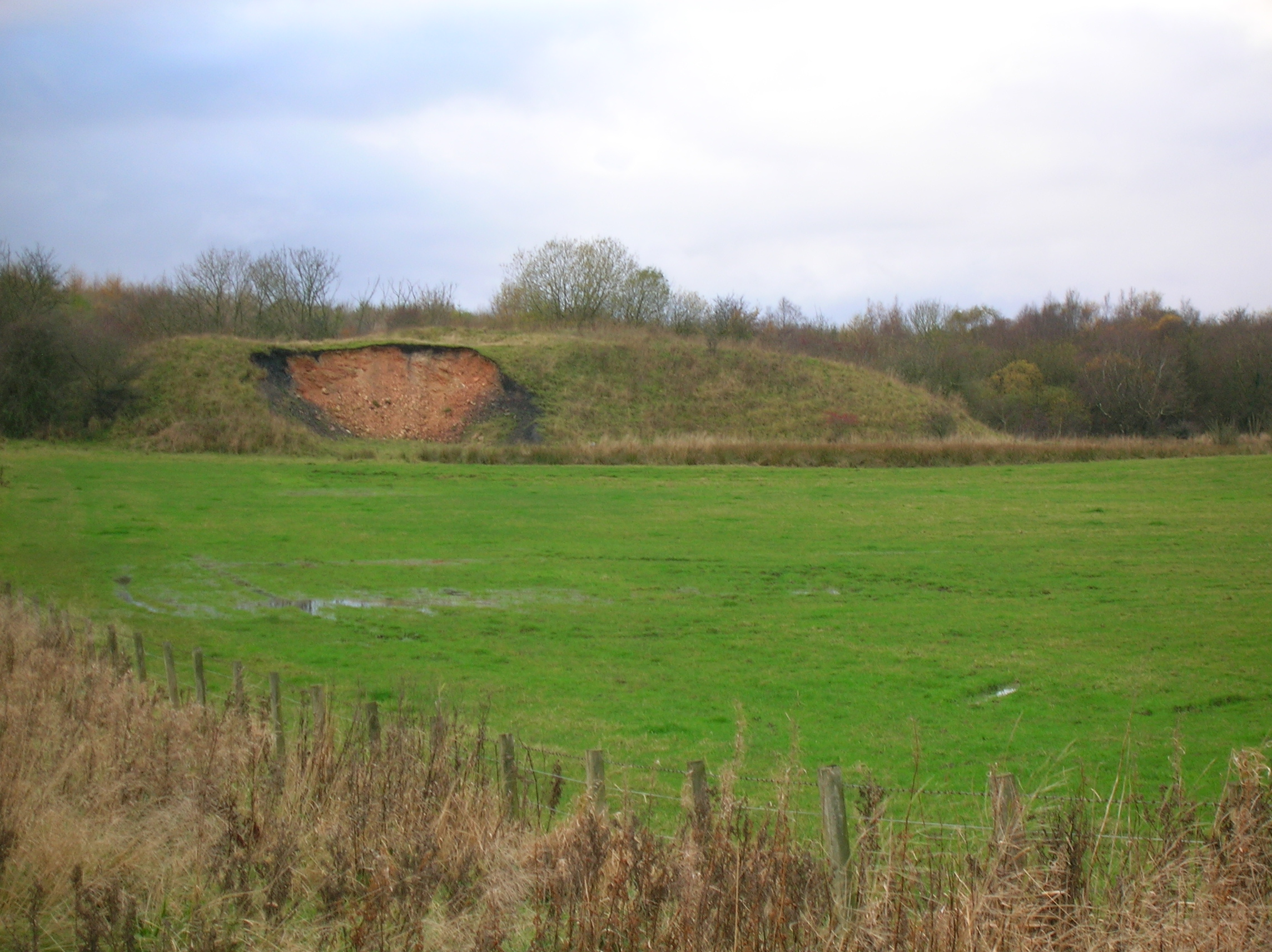
Fergushill no 28 pit bing

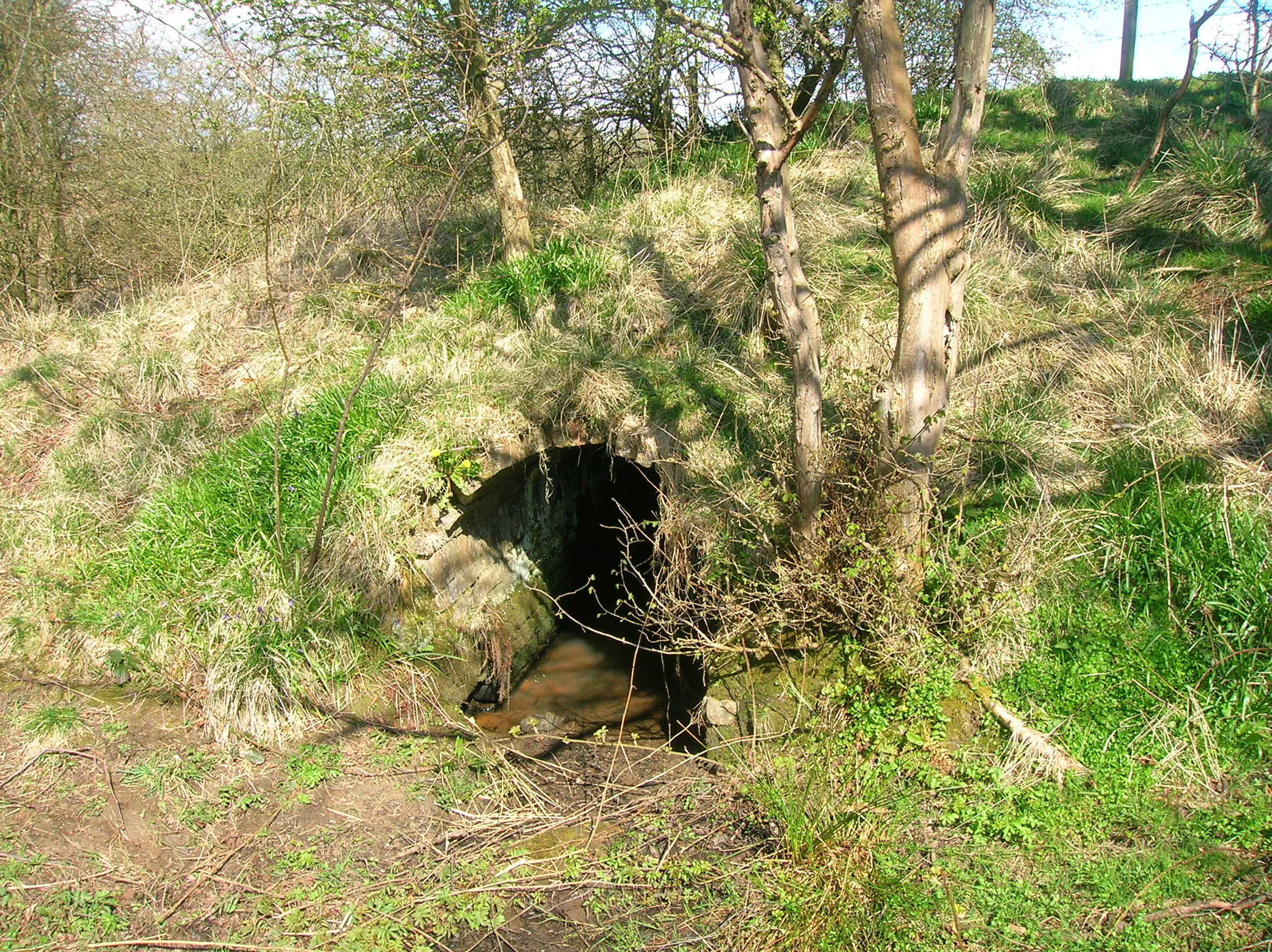
A brick lined culvert at Fergushill no 28 colliery

A colliery is a coal mine together with its physical plant and outbuildings. It differs from a pit in the degree of complexity and sophistication; by inference the term is used for coal mines established from the time of the industrial revolution onwards.

Eglinton No.10 was also known as Corsehillhead; Knox's; Lady Gardener; and Pyetbog. It produced Ladyha', Ell and Wee coal, being abandoned in 1900. Fergushills nos 29 and 30 (named Montgomeryfield after a miner who died at the mine) were near Sourlie Hill roundabout; Fergushills nos 28 & 26 (Sourlie), the 'Happy Home' were near the Draught Burn and closed on 15 July 1921 (the bings survive). Fergushill 28's railway culvert for the Draught Burn survives; the burn has however changed course. 100 men were employed here; Fergushill no 22, the 'Diamond', was at Chapelholms (the bings survive), abandoned 1889; Fergushill 23, also called the 'Happy Home', was near no 22; Shipmill no 3 was near Sourlie, opened in the mid 1930s and closed on 13 October 1945; Fergushill no 17, Rover, was near Chapelholms Wood (bings survive), abandoned 1921; Fergushill (Holm) no 23 was near North Millburn farm (the bings survive).

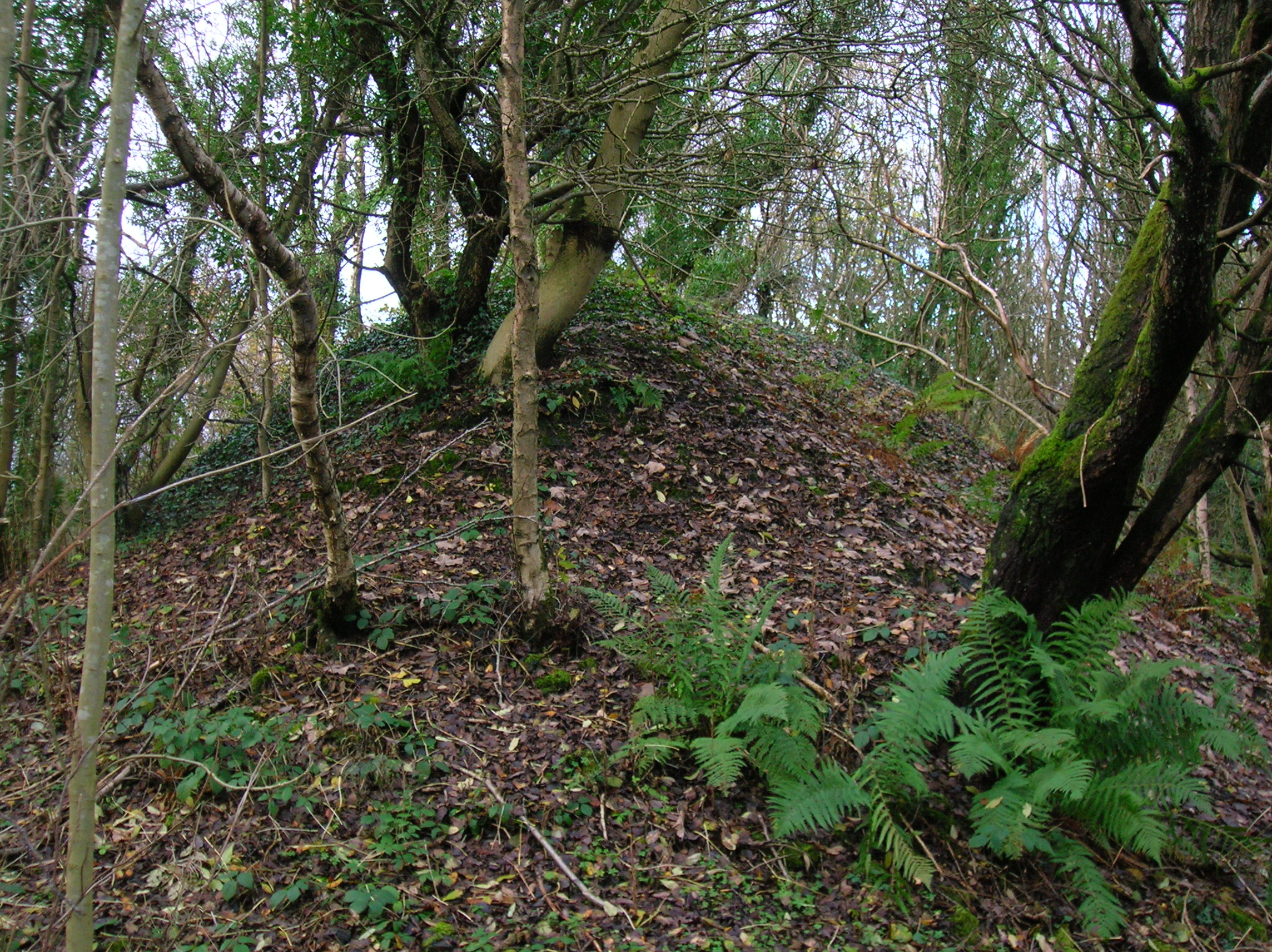
Fergushill no 26 pit bing

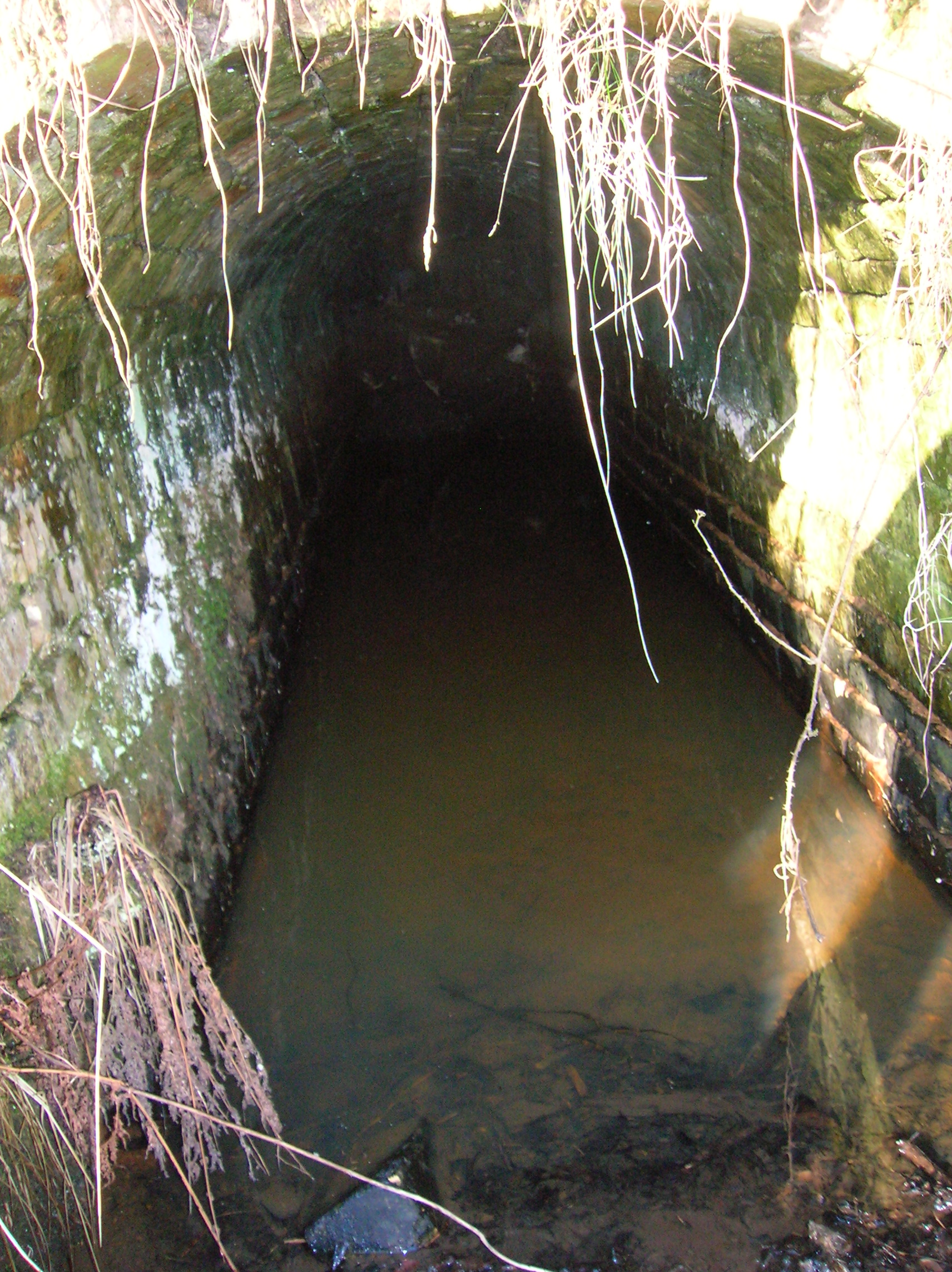
Doura Burn culvert under the old mineral railway at Fergushill no 28.

Moncur no 4 & no 5 were near Eglinton Kennels (bings survive), abandoned 1919; Ladyha no 1 was at the Bannoch Road; Ladyha no 2 was at Lady Ha' (substantial remains); and Eglinton no 1, Lady Sophia (name after the 14th Earl's eldest daughter, opened in 1883 & closed 1930), was near the hospital; Redburn closed in 1930. Eglinton colliery and Ladyha no 1 were situated near Buckreddan, just off the Bannoch Road. Redstone colliery was located near Kenneth's castle towards Bridgend. A colliery was present at Bartonholm, closed by Bairds in 1928; Bogside closed in 1929. Other collieries were at Stobbs, Monkridden, and Seven Acres (Snacres).

The Diamond pit (Fergushill no 22) explains the modern name 'Diamond Bridge' which is given to Chapelholms bridge and the name 'Diamond Lodge' which may have been the now demolished Chapel cottage. Black Diamond was a favourite horse of one of the Earls.

The Statistical Account records that the coals at Doura were main and stone-coals. Laigh Fergus-hill (sic) mine was owned by Mr McDowal and was leased by him for £100 per annum in the 18th century. Eglinton Colliery was flooded for some years after miners broke into an old waste at Fergushill in November 1747. The early mines were laid up in the 1790s.

==== Ladyha No 2 colliery ====
The colliery infrastructure consisted of: 1 – Downcast shaft & winding engine house; 2 – upcast shaft and winding engine/cum pump house; 3 – engineer's and blacksmith's shops; 4 – winch house; 5 – store; 6 – office; 7 – boiler house and chimney; 8 – screening house; 9 – fan/compressor house; 10 – wagon traverser; 11 – underground band haulage.

Ladyha No 2 pit was sunk in 1885 to a depth of 568 feet (173 m) and closed in May 1934, having struggled since its main customer, the Eglinton Iron Company, closed in 1928. A fairly substantial brick-lined tunnel still survives which once carried a standard gauge railway line unobtrusively to Ladyha colliery, out of the Earl's sight and the smoke kept away from the kitchen gardens' greenhouses and plants. Other such cosmetic tunnels exist at Alloway and near Culzean Castle. The tunnel was used during World War II as a bomb shelter and storage area for furniture; it remains in good condition. The old colliery ruins were razed to the ground in 2011, having been assessed as a danger to the public.

Views of the old Ladyha colliery and tunnel prior to 2011

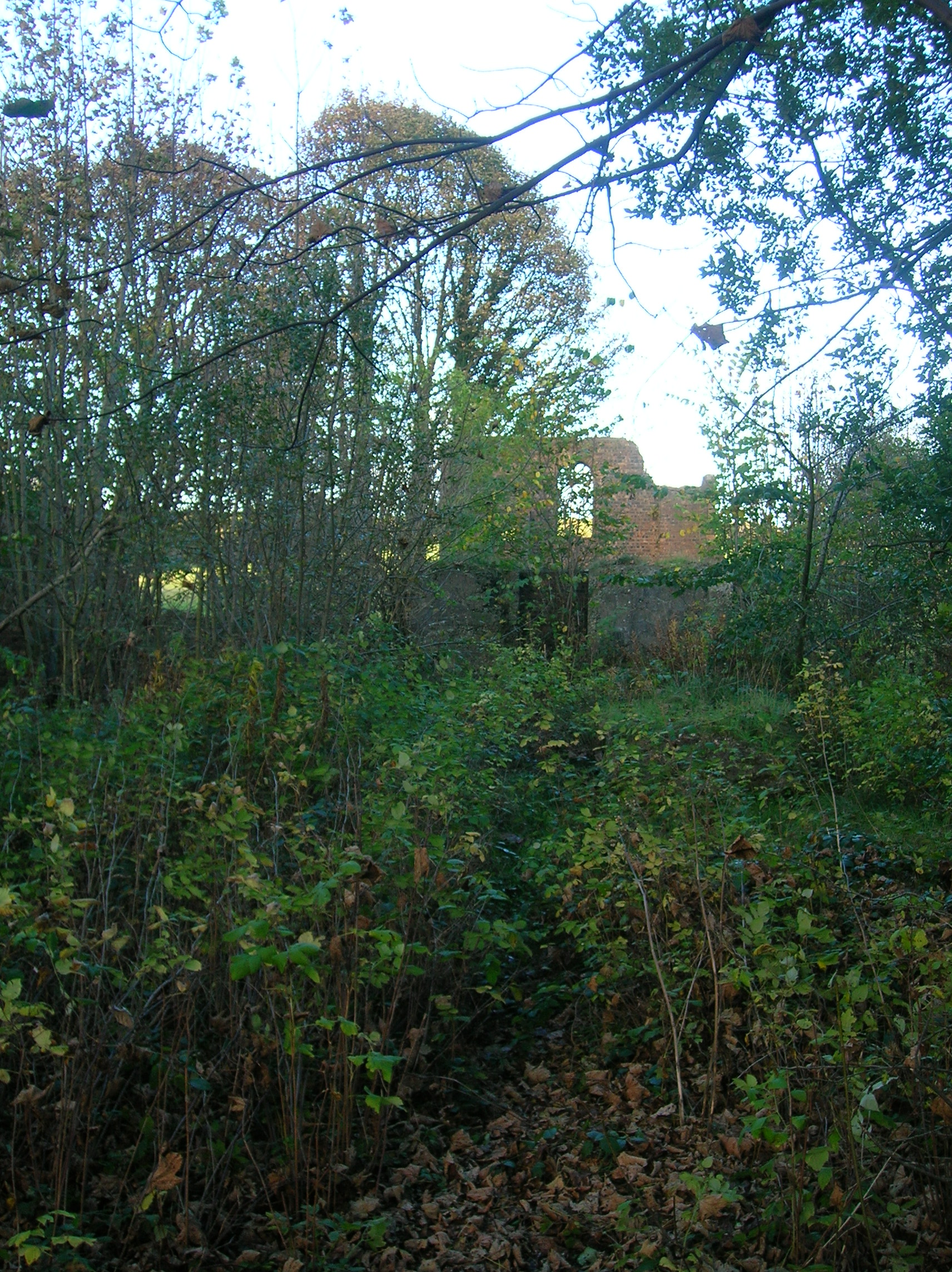
Ladyha colliery ruins in 2010. The colliery closed in 1934.

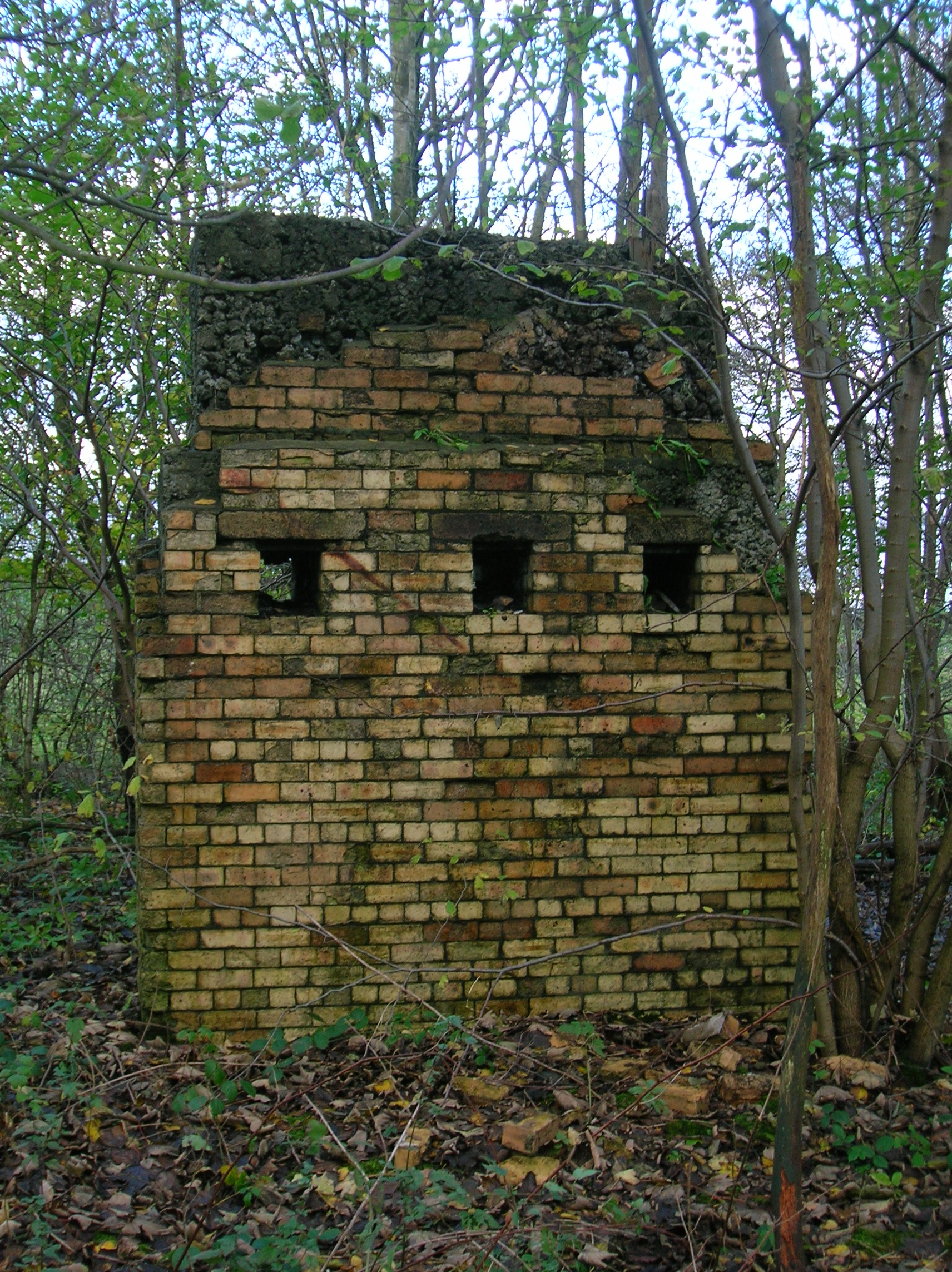
Remains of the waggon traverser in 2010.

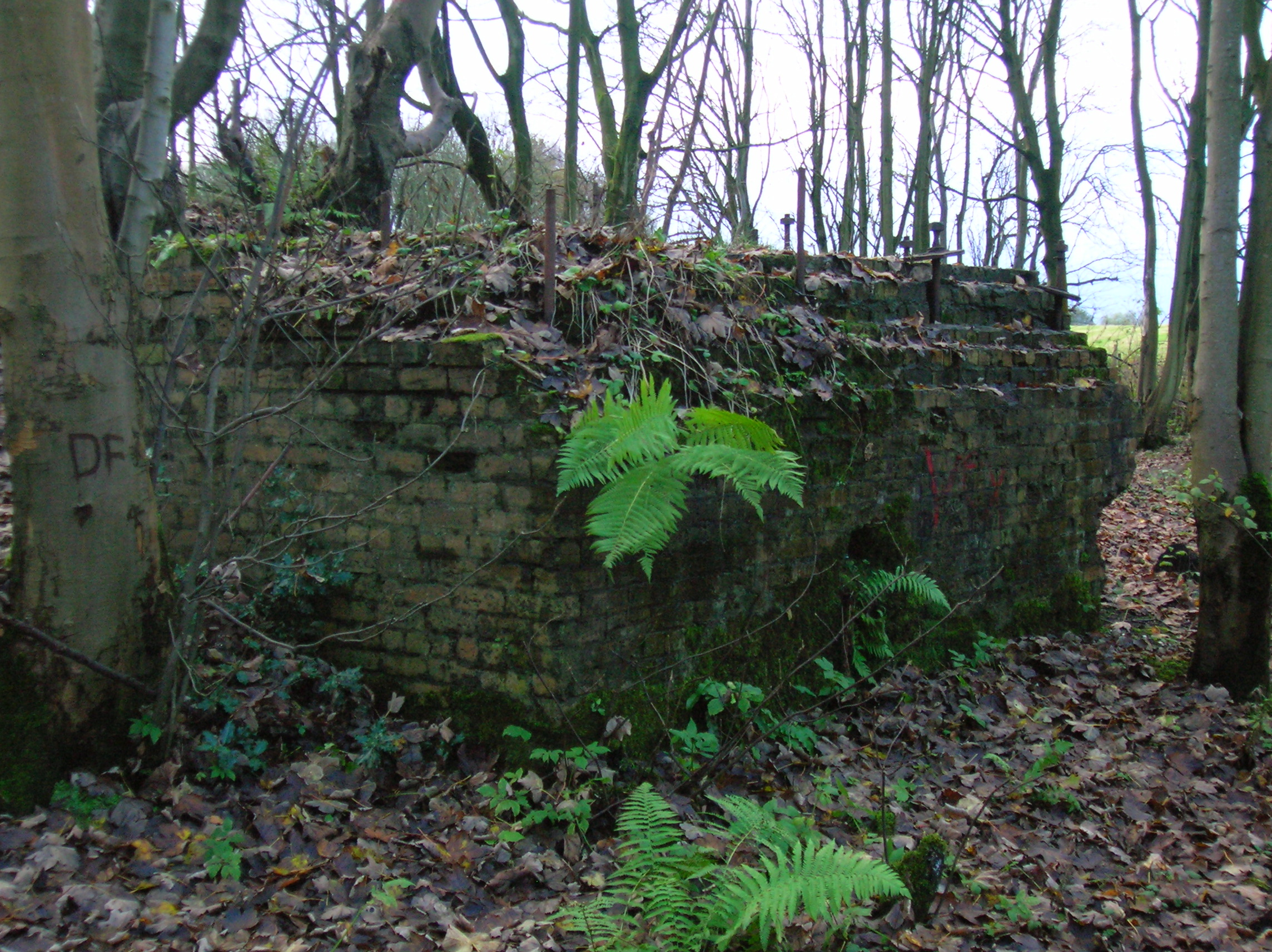
Remains of the underground band haulage system in 2010.

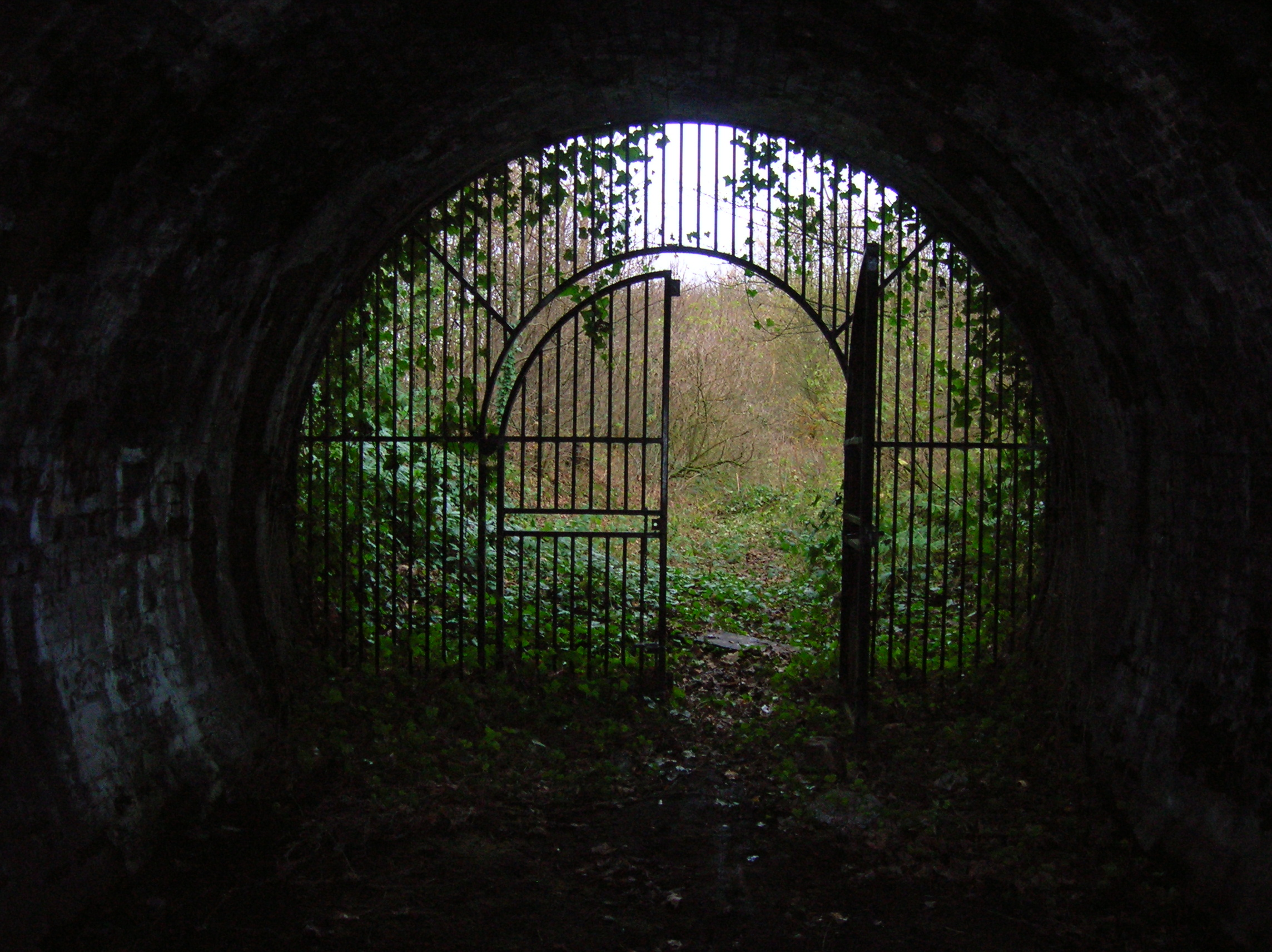
Looking out towards the site of the old colliery.

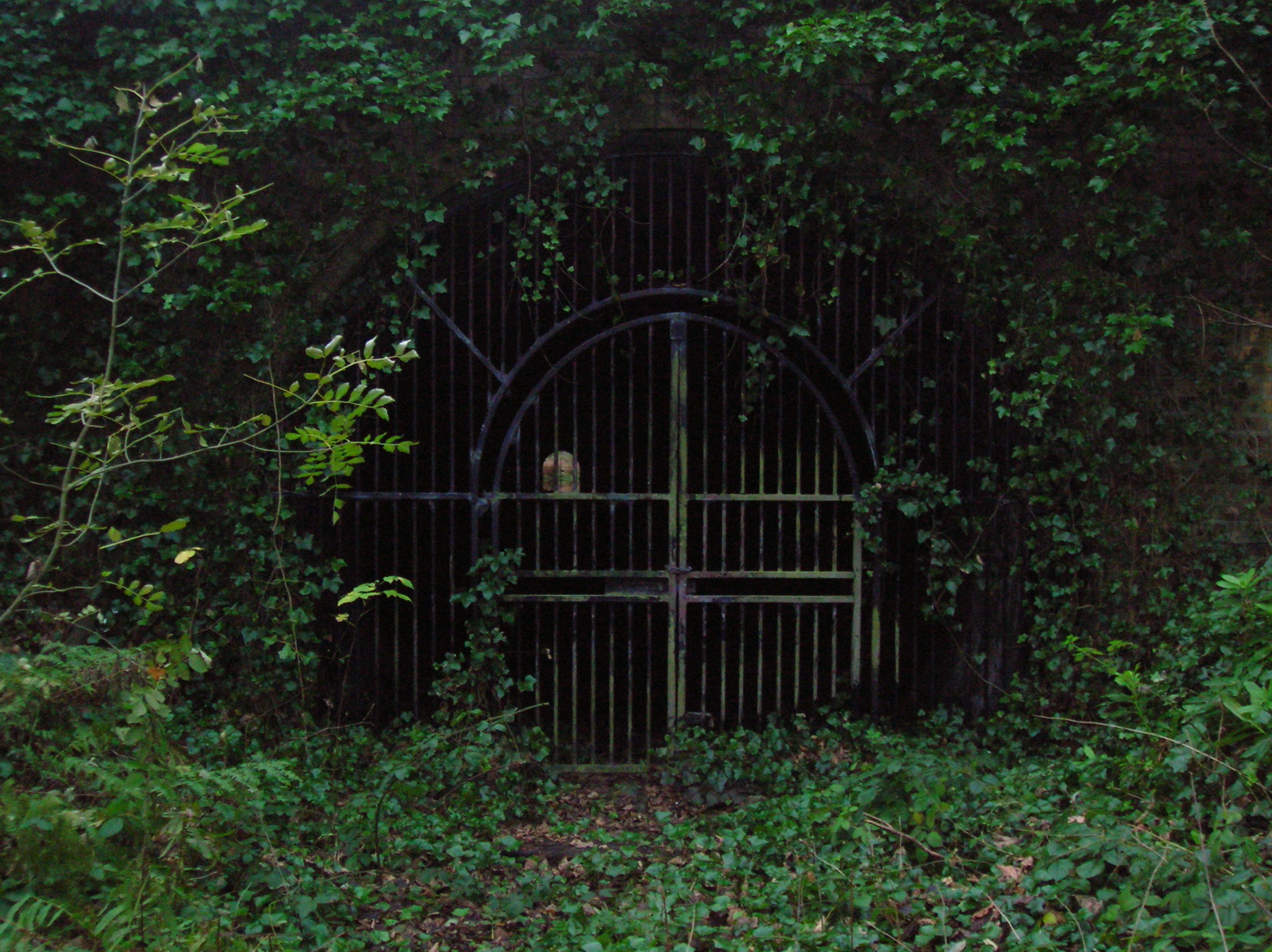
Looking towards the tunnel entrance from the site of Ladyha Colliery. The other end of the tunnel is visible.

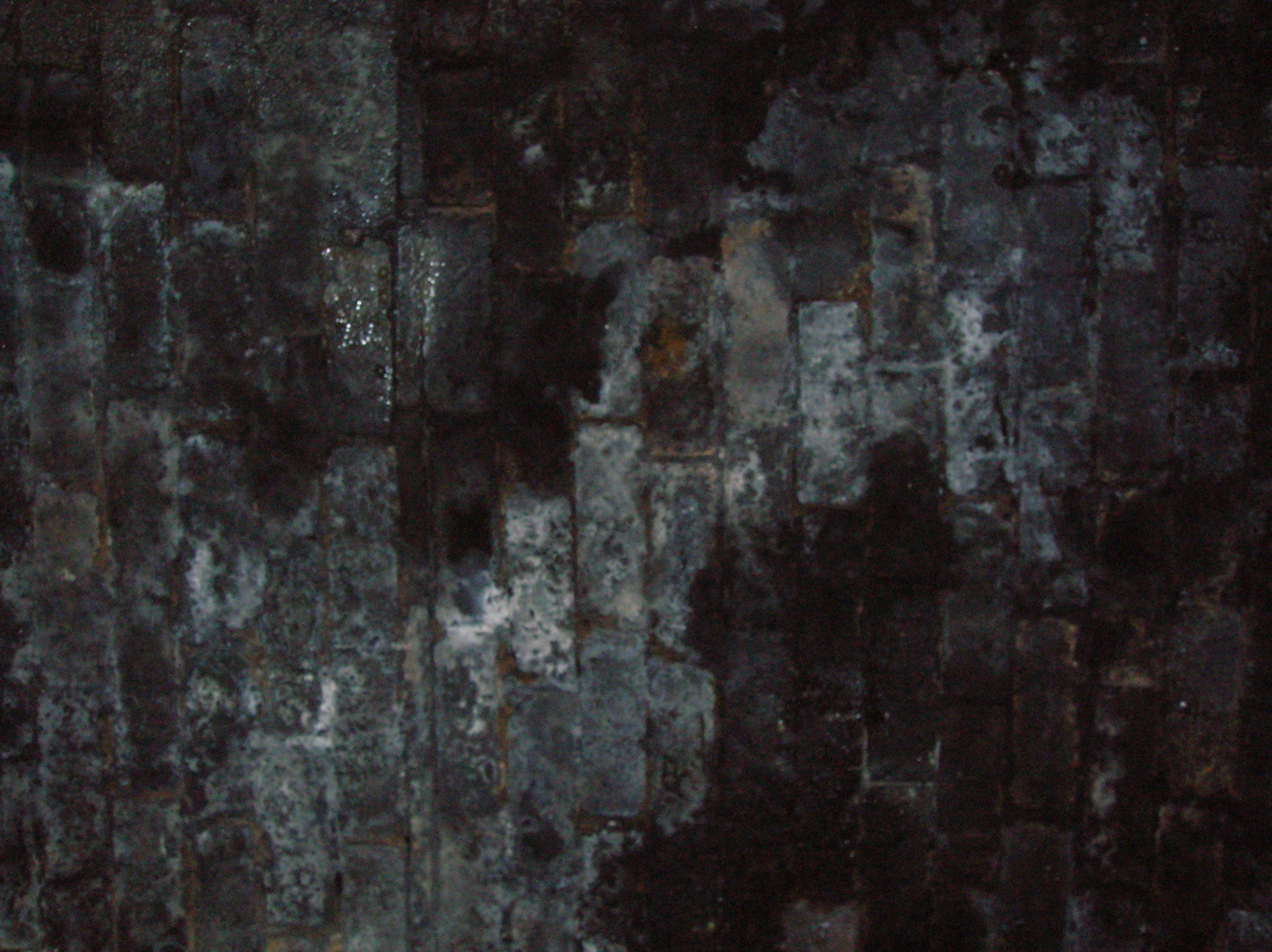
Detail of the bricks lining the tunnel.

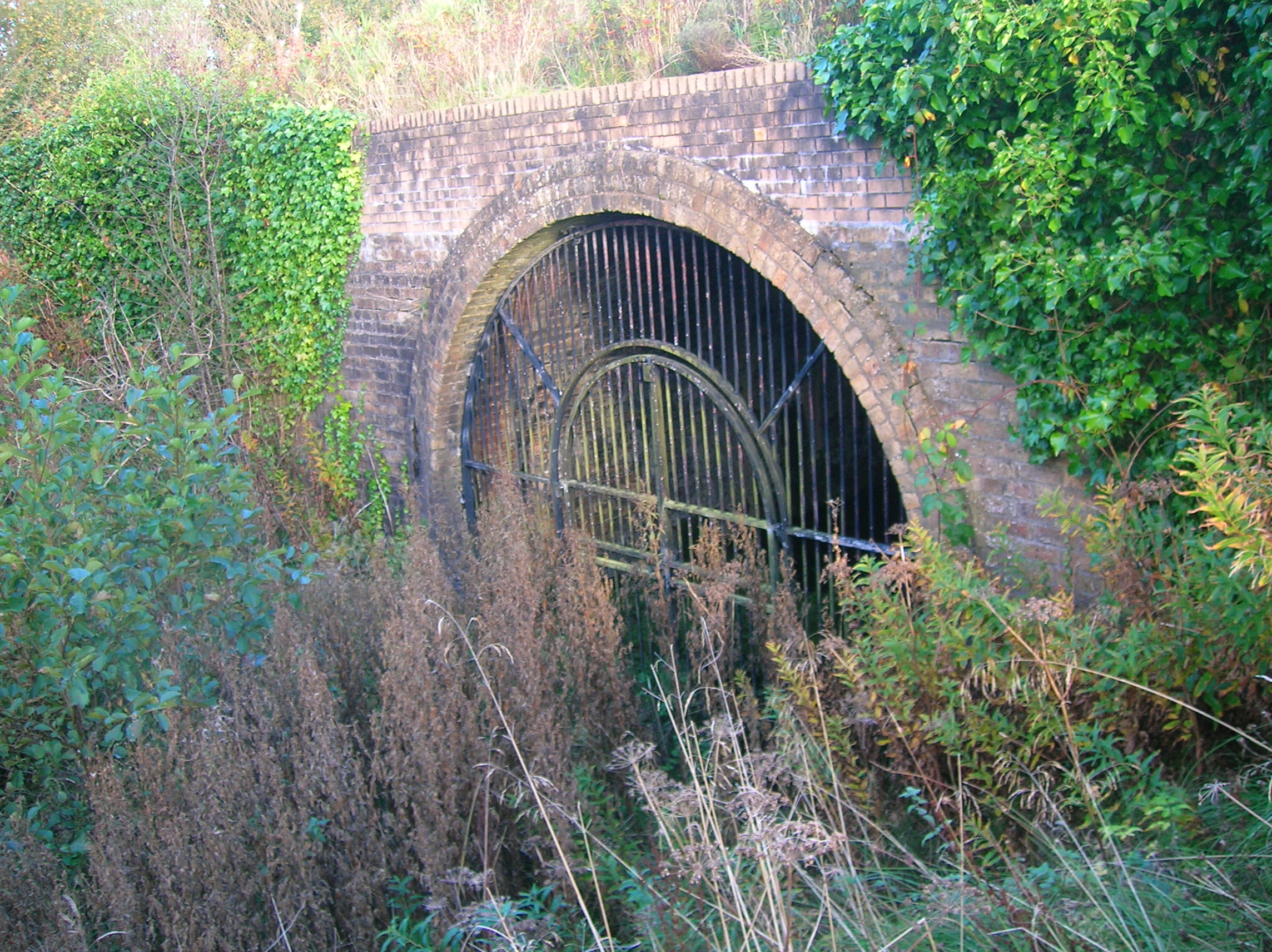
The 19th-century tunnel entrance on the standard gauge branchline to Ladyha colliery.

==== Longford Misk, Snodgrass Misk and Bartonholm coal workings ====
A plan of these coal workings was produced in 1841 shows the extensive infrastructure of Snodgrass Misk colliery in particular, with numerous tunnels running under the Water of Garnock, leaks recorded and several coal loading places. Snodgrass pit itself was served in addition by a short canal. Longford Misk had a less complex layout, however an apparent waggonway is shown leading to a coal loading point on the river. On Bartonholm at this time were located a mining village and the pits of William, John, and New or Gorge.

=== Opencast mining ===
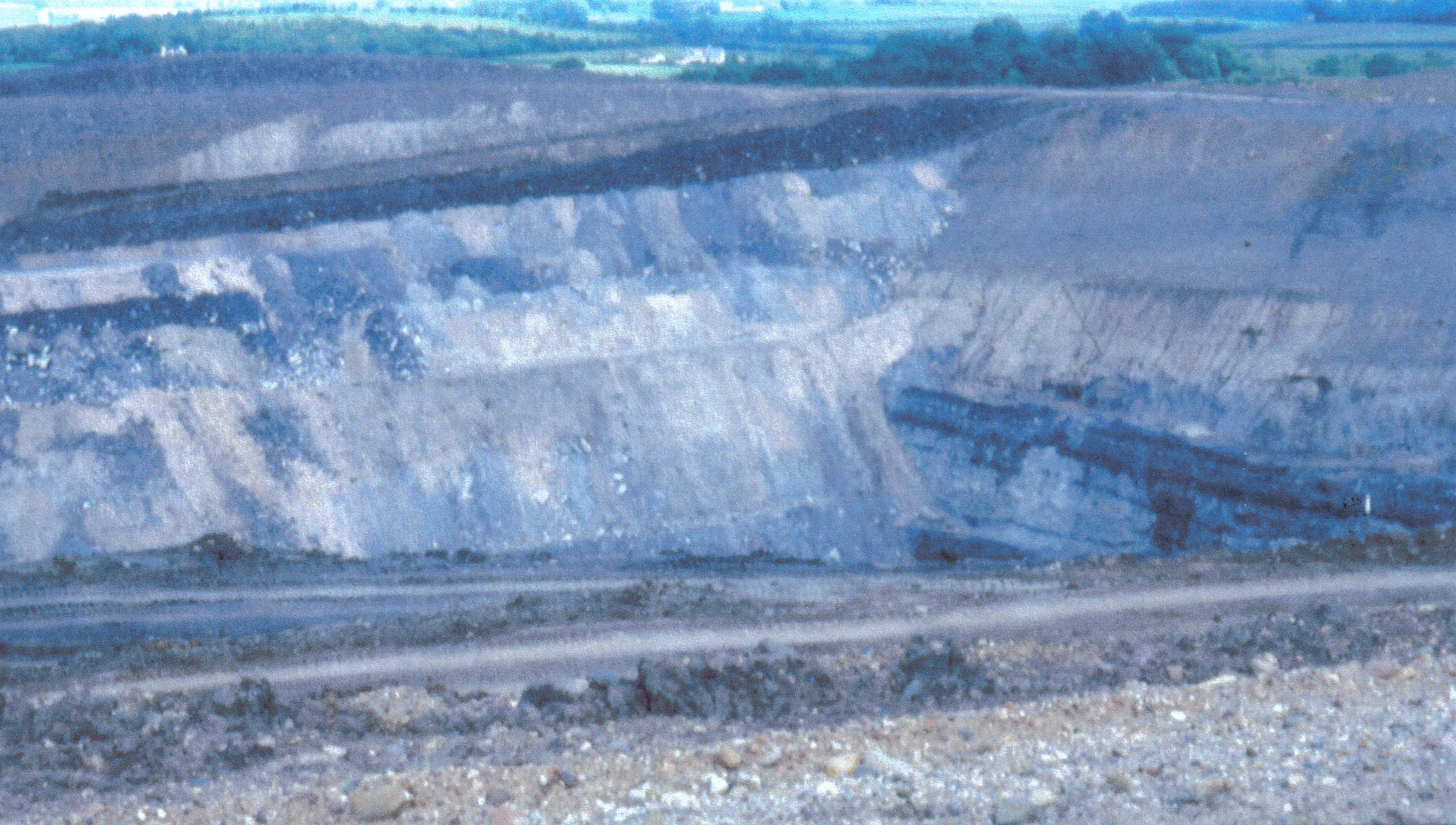
The Sourlie OpenCast coal mine

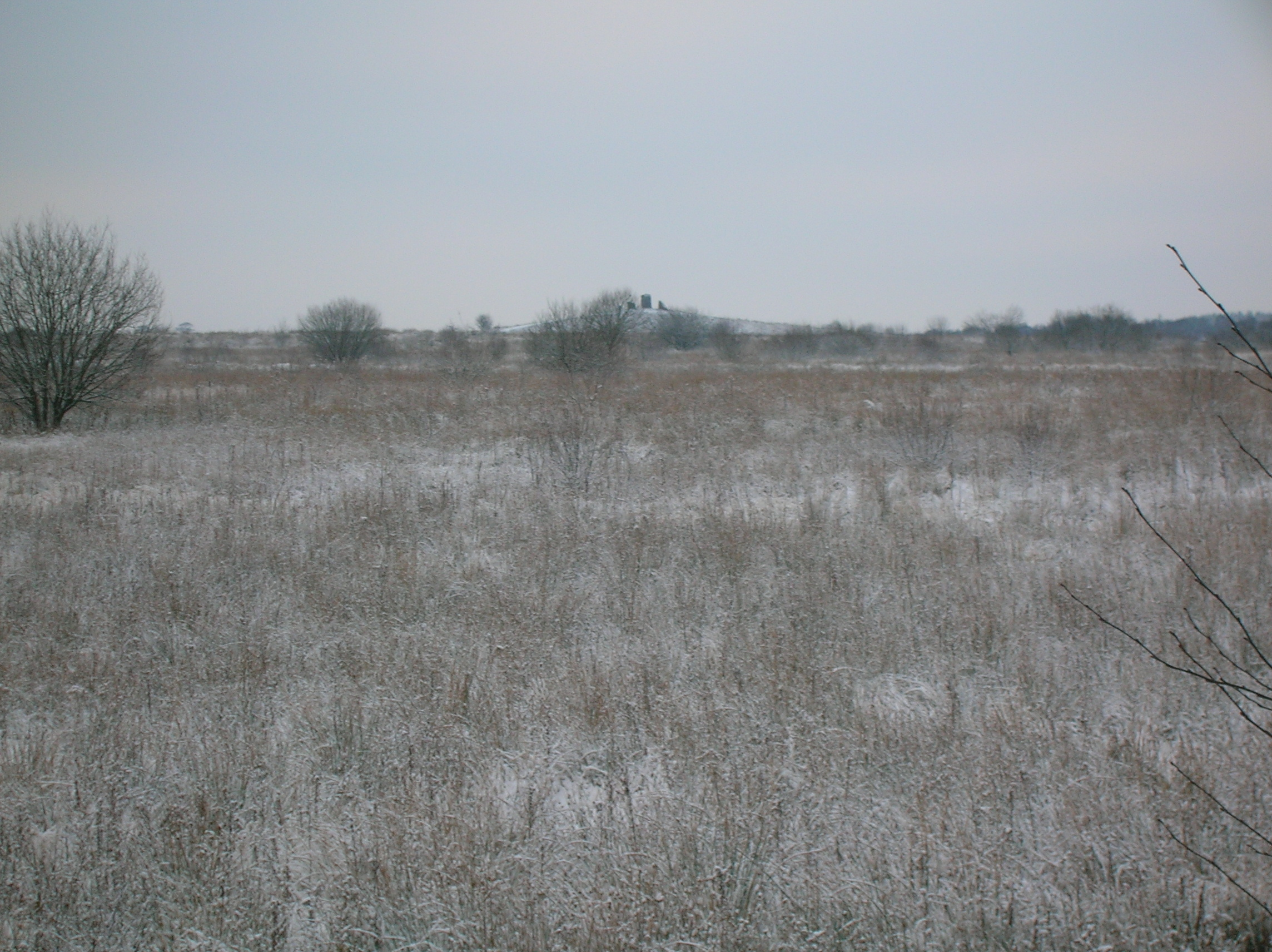
Cairnmount and Sourlie at the site of the opencast mine

An opencast mine was established by Irvine Development Corporation (IDC) and the National Coal Board/British Coal at Sourlie in the 1983. Linnbed, Parrot, Turf and Wee coals were mined; stoops from the 'Hutch Longwall' method of coal extraction within old collieries were exposed during excavations. All the suitable coals had been removed by 1986 and reclamation completed by 1987. The Draught Burn was diverted to accommodate this and the surviving 'Settling pond or lagoon' comes from the project.

Reclamation involved the creation of a feature on the restored Sourlie Hill, now known as confusingly as 'Cairnmount' (the original Cairnmount is located a short distance to the north-east), as part of the landscaping of the mine site, the large boulders for this project were found during the works. These standing stones are seen by many as genuine ancient megaliths. A large landscape 'bowl' was also created. The categories of coal extracted were Five Quarter, Linnbed, Parrot, Turf and Wee, totalling 255,028 Tonnes with 5.6 million metres cubed of material excavated in total.

Upon the closure of Sourlie opencast, coal mining on the Eglinton Estate had finally ceased after nearly five centuries.

Several sub-fossil antlers of Reindeer (29,900 years old) and also bones of the Woolly Rhinoceros Coelondonta antiquitatis, (50-100,000 years old) were found at Sourlie. Both of these species was hunted by early humans, who may have caused their extinction.

==== Sourlie views ====
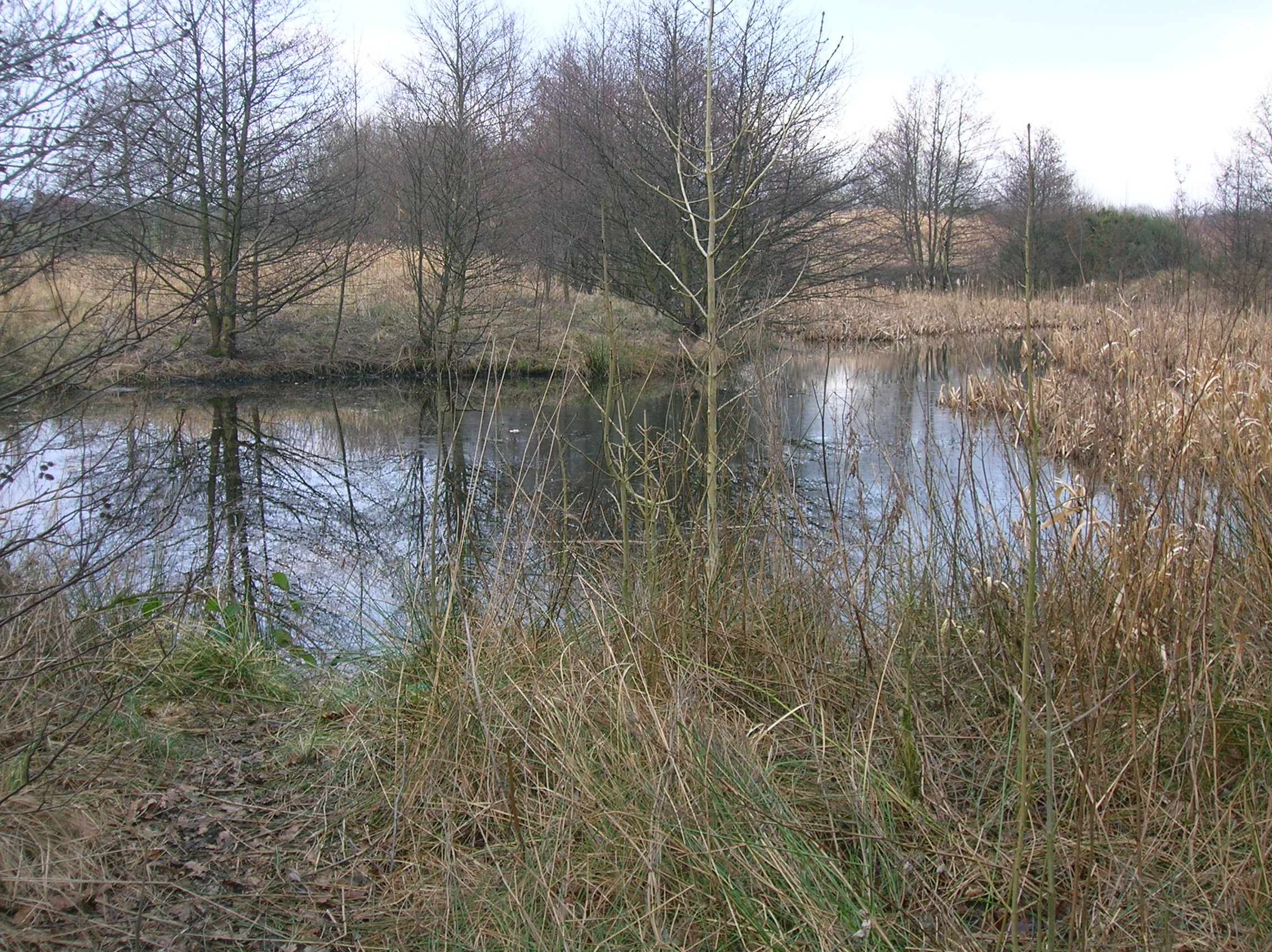
The settling pond / lagoon

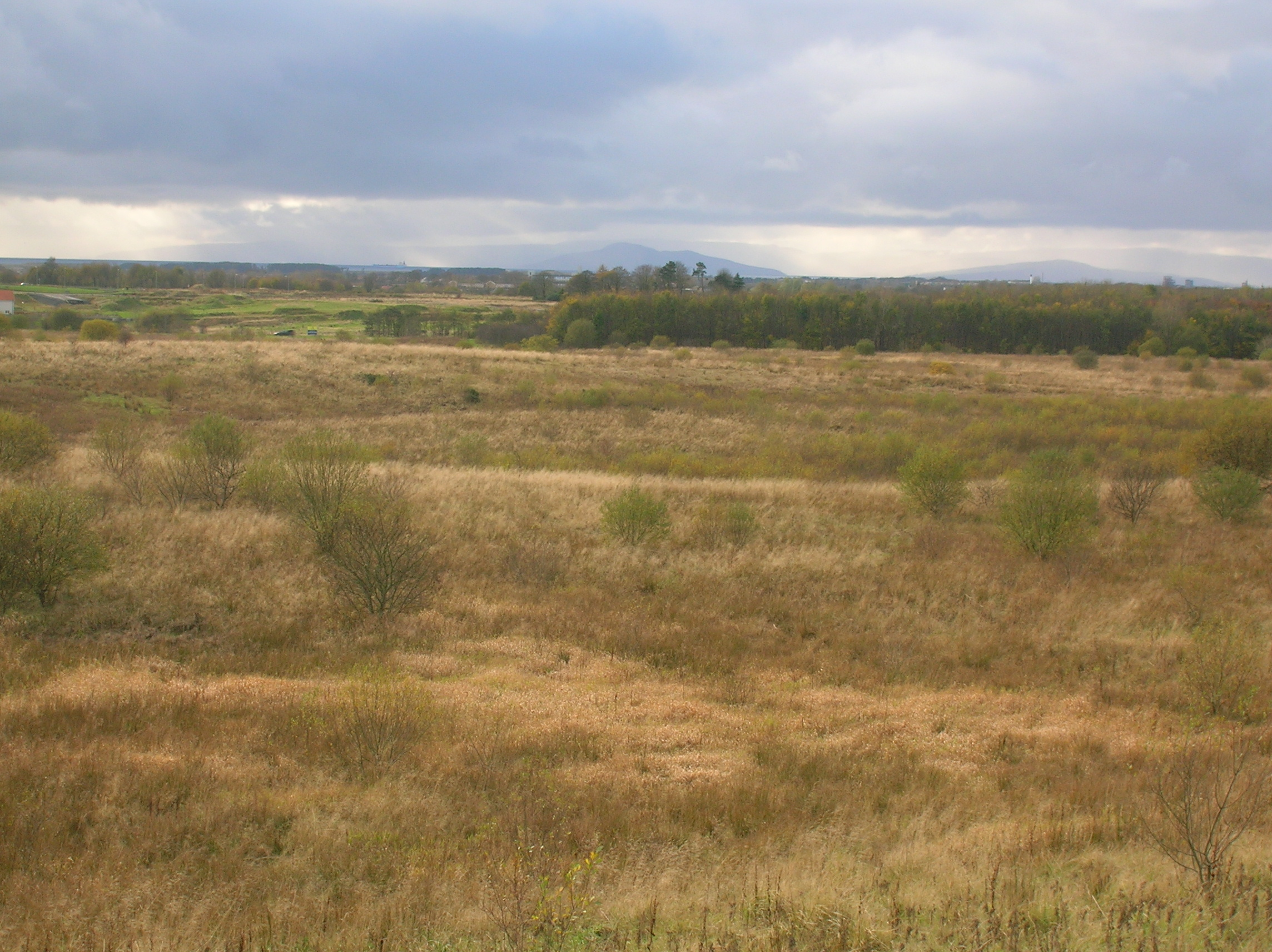
Looking from Cairnmount across the old opencast site with the 'bowl' in the foreground

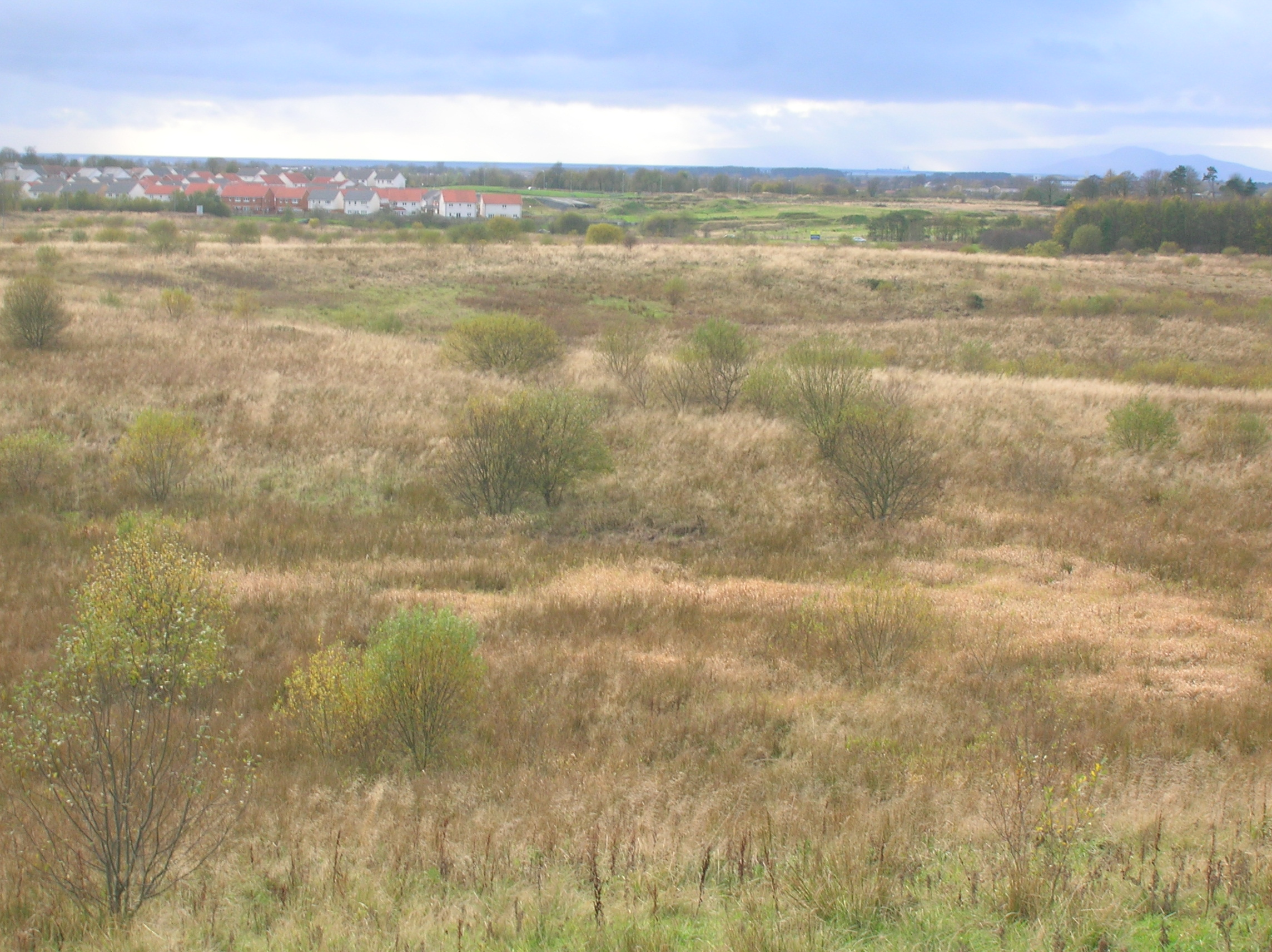
The old opencast site looking towards the Montgomery Park housing scheme

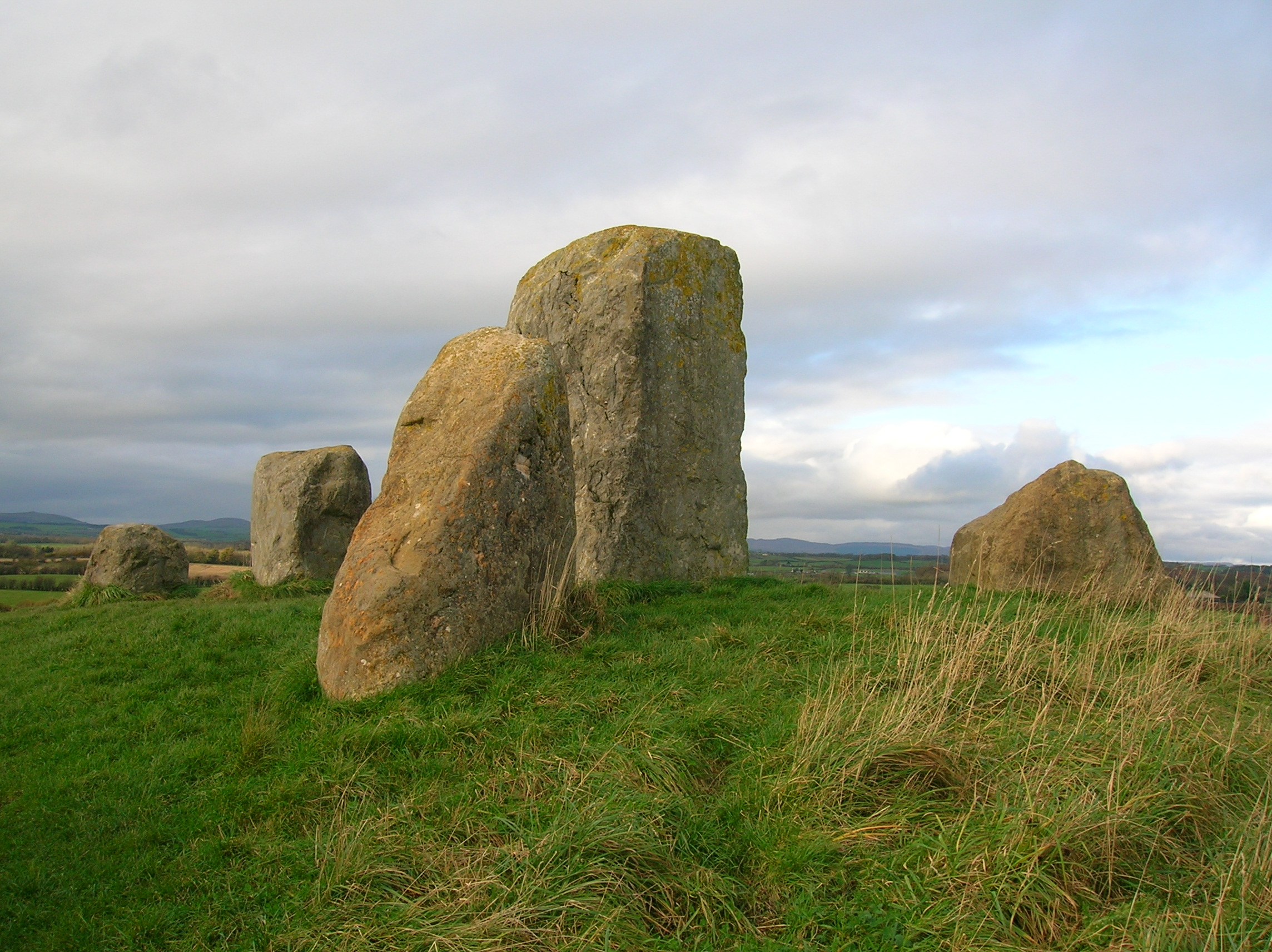
The standing stones feature at Cairnmount (Sourlie Hill)

== Mine disasters ==
=== Deaths and injuries ===
Mining is a very hazardous, if not the most hazardous occupation; deaths and severe injuries were an inevitable part of the job as indicated by the following selection from the records:-

At Bartonholm no 3 in 1871 four were killed when fire damp was ignited – William Graham age 55, Charles McDonald age 56, Thomas McQuade age 45, and Samuel Holmes age 29. In 1874 at Eglinton Colliery an oversmen, James Lawson, aged 59, was killed when he fell down the shaft. In December 1874 a 16-year-old collier, Alexander Cupples, was killed at Bartonholm when the roof and sides of the tunnel collapsed. On 19 July 1883, at Redburn Pit, James Shearer 18 years of age, was very seriously injured when he accidentally fell off his horse and was run over by several of the hutches he was pulling. On 15 May 1908 Thomas Kirkwood, aged 24, was killed while at work in Sourlie pit; he was buried beneath a fall from the roof, and suffocated. On 3 May 1911 at Redburn No 1, Andrew Blackley was killed by a fall from the roof. On 27 March 1913 at Lady Sophia pit, Robert M'Grevey, 39 years of age, was instantaneously killed while at the Lady Sophia pit, when he was struck by a fall of coal and killed instantly. On 11 November 1920 Henry Coulter, died as the result of injuries caused by a breakaway of hutches which took place in Lady Ha' pit. Besides other injuries, his back was broken, and he died on the way to the Infirmary. A miner named Daniel Wales was instantaneously killed by a fall of stones in Lady Ha' Pit on 20 September 1921. On 19 April 1927 a miner named Alexander Duncan, was accidentally killed while at work in the Lady Ha' Pit. Alexander was engaged along with his brother in clearing away a fall when he was crushed by two large stones which came away from the roof.

==== An incident at the Fergushill No 22, Diamond pit ====
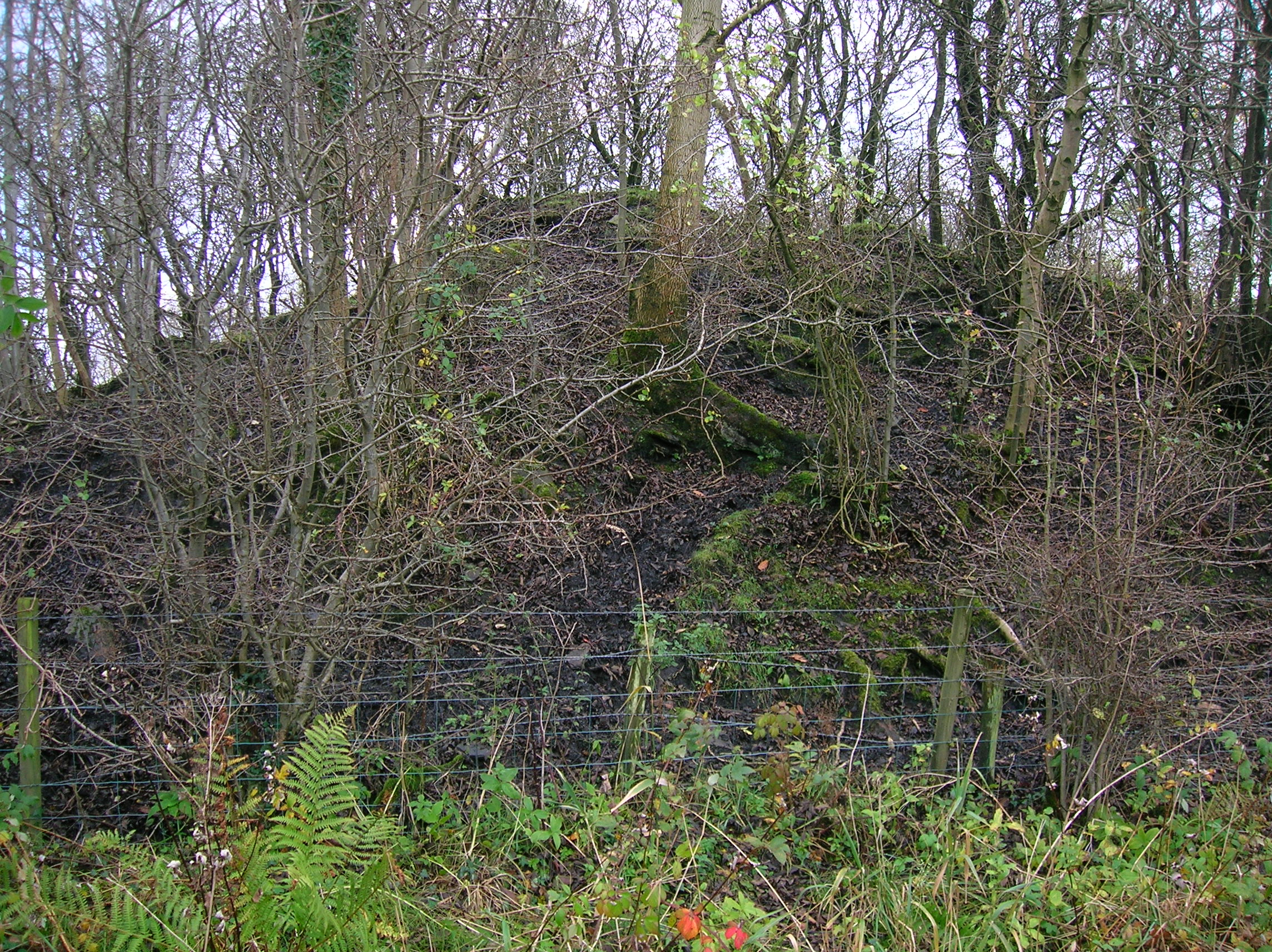
The Diamond pit bing, Fergushill no 22

On 7 August 1913 an explosion occurred at this pit, which belonged to Messrs A. Finnie & Sons. Two miners named Andrew Allardyce and Hugh Galone, were at work in a section of the pit by themselves when the accident occurred. A miner named Hugh Montgomery, who was working in another part of the pit some hundreds of yards distant, became conscious of a vibration, and at first thought that something had gone wrong in No 23 pit, which connects with No 22. On further inquiry, however, he had reason to believe that the explosion had taken place in the workings occupied by the two men named, and this was confirmed by two pony drivers, who emerged from the direction of the occurrence.

The condition of the air was such that the area could not be reached. Later, in travelling along the air course, the rescuers came across Hugh Galone, who had crawled from the danger zone to the pit bottom, a distance of about 300 yards. Hugh was in a semi-conscious condition, and was unable to tell anything of the accident. At the surface it was found that he had sustained serious burning injuries besides shock, and he was taken to Kilmarnock Infirmary for treatment. The remains of Allardyce were recovered later.

=== The Garnock and the Kilwinning mine flooding disaster of 1833 ===
On 20 June 1833 the surface of the Garnock was seen to be ruffled and it was discovered that a section of the river bed had collapsed into mineworkings beneath. The river was now flowing into miles of mineworkings of the Snodgrass, Bartonholm and Longford collieries. Attempts were made to block the breach with clay, whin, straw, etc to no avail. The miners had been safely brought to the surface and were able to witness the sight of the river standing dry for nearly a mile downstream, with fish jumping about in all directions. The tide brought in sufficient water to complete the flooding of the workings and the river level returned to normal.

The weight of the floodwater was so great that the compressed air broke through the ground in numerous places and many acres of ground were observed to bubble up like a pan of boiling water. In some places rents and cavities appeared measuring four or five feet in diameter, and from these came a roaring sound described as being like steam escaping from a safety valve. For about five hours great volumes of water and sand were thrown up into the air like fountains and the mining villages of Bartonholm, Snodgrass, Longford and Nethermains were flooded.

== The Eglinton Ironworks ==
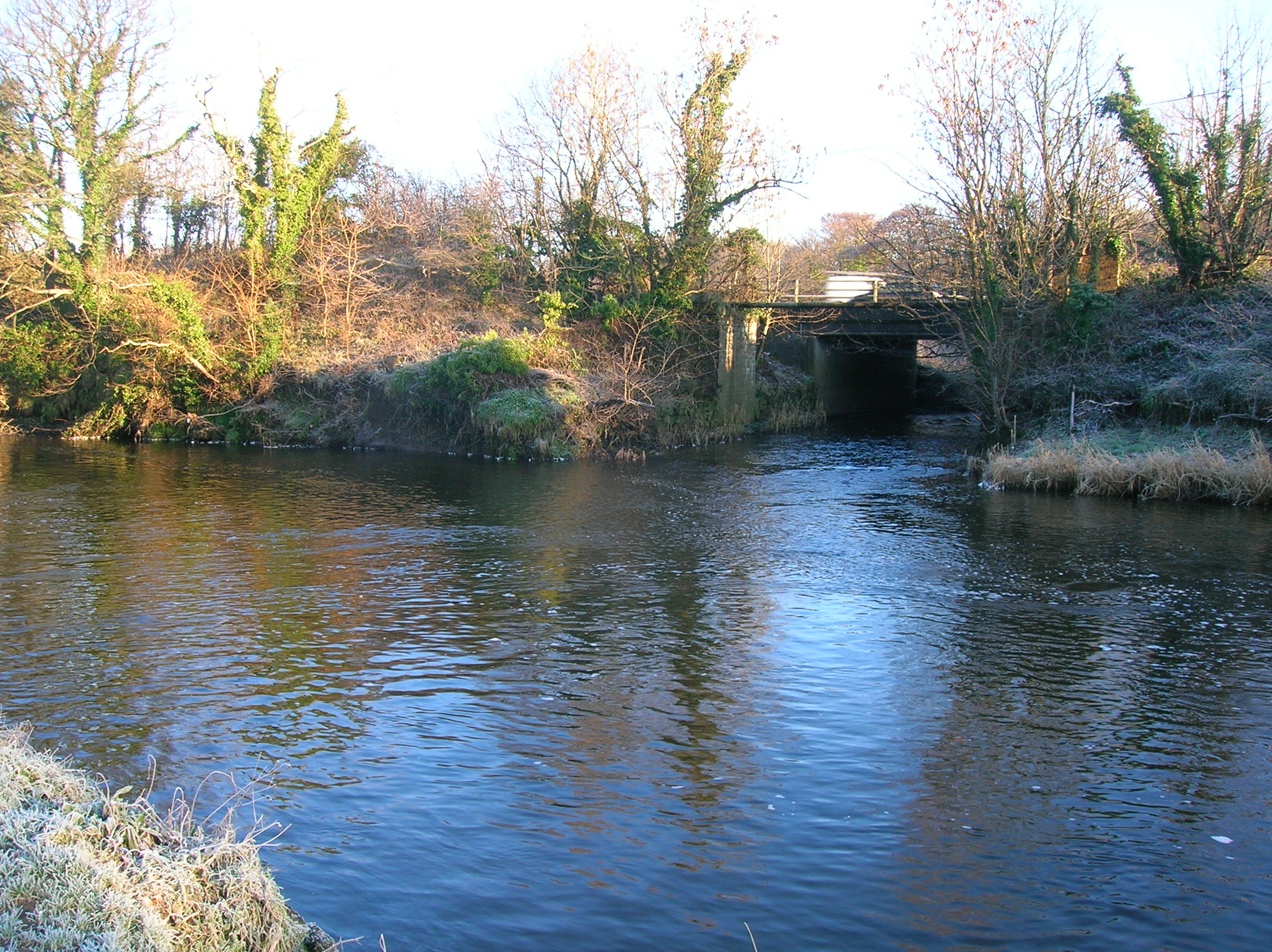
The confluence of the Lugton Water and the Garnock near the old Eglinton Steelworks

Archibald William, the 13th Earl of Eglinton purchased all the lands concerned with the inundation by the River Garnock and through the simple expedient of cutting a short canal at Bogend, across the loop of the river involved, he bypassed the breach and once the river course had been drained and sealed off he was able in 1853 to have the flooded mineworkings pumped out. The breach lay on the sea side of the loop close to Bogend on the Snodgrass Holm side. The Earl leased the mines to Bairds of Gartsherrie and the "Eglinton Iron Works" were born. In 1855, after considerable investigation, the company introduced the Longwall method of mining, producing more coal more cheaply, however although owning a number of mines, they mainly purchased their coal from other mine owners.

Bairds of Gartsherrie reached agreement with Archibald William, 13th Earl of Eglinton, on land costs and mineral royalties and by midsummer 1845 work on the Eglinton Ironworks was well underway at Stobbs farm between Irvine and Kilwinning. The 1866 ironworks colliers strike led to unemployed Cornish tin miners being employed. Eglinton ironworks village 1850 to 1930s. The Eglinton Iron Company had at one point covered 28 hectares (69 acres) with eight furnaces and a 100,000 ton iron production per year.

John Jack was the first manager and the well known Ayrshire antiquary, geologist and natural historian, John Smith (1846–1930) was manager for Messrs W. Baird at the ironworks from 1870 to 1890, moving here from Lugar. The works closed in 1924. Only the Blacklands Community Centre remains as the old Bairds miners library and recreation hall; even the slag heap has been removed to build the Hunterston Deep Water terminal.

== Industrial relations ==
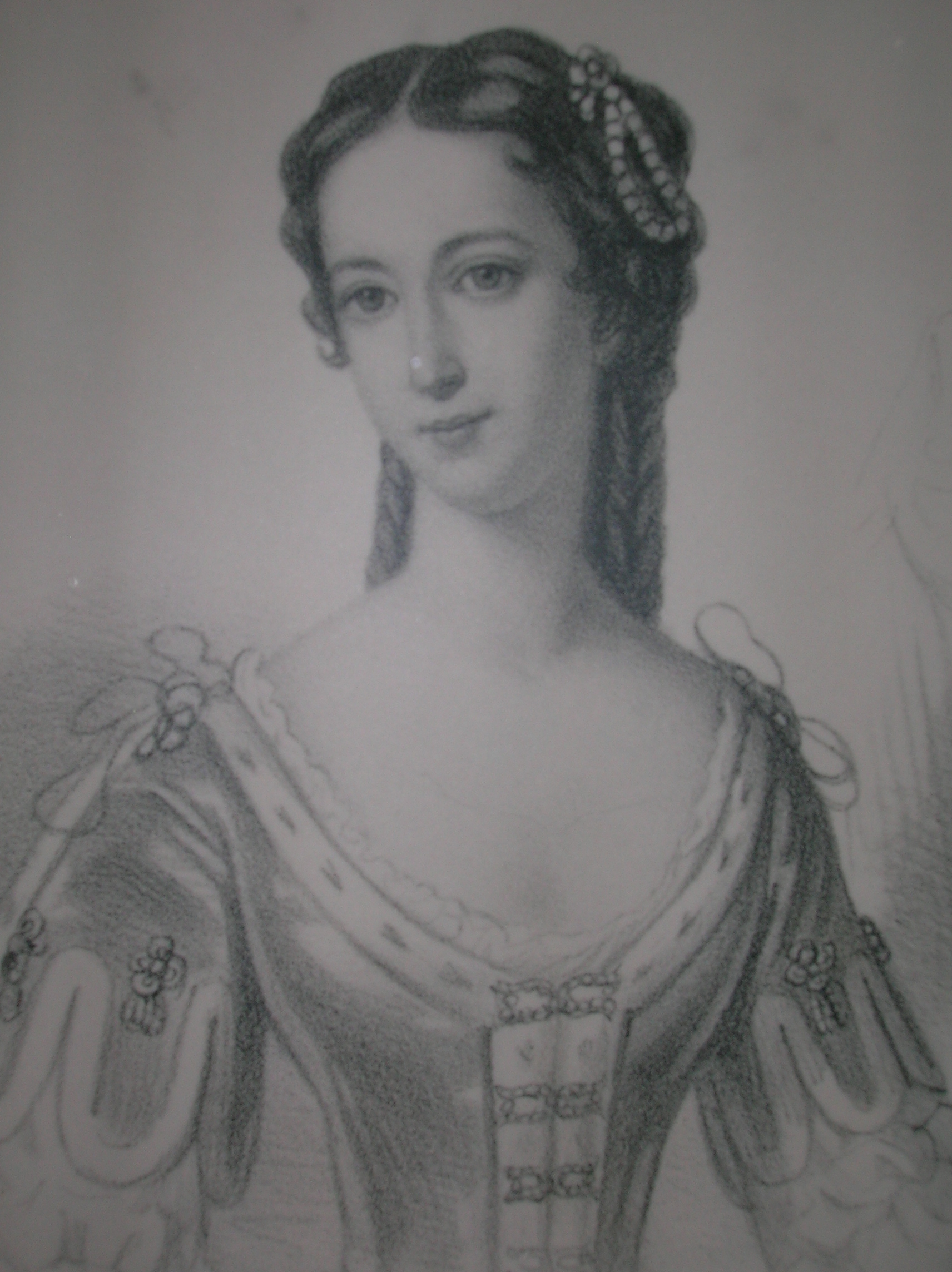
Susanna Montgomery, Countess of Eglinton

Usually the Earls left industrial relations to employees, however Lady Susanna, wife of the 9th Earl, was involved in the general supervision of miners on the estate as shown by her correspondence and the fact that she intervened in the 1749 – 50 labour unrest. A new grieve at the Earl's Millburn pit reduced the hewing rates and the hewers complained that they were like 'severest slaves' and had to work 14 hours a day, six days a week to make a living. They also claimed that at the end of the working day they were so exhausted that they struggled to even exit the pit.

Susanna summoned the miners to Eglinton Castle to try and sort things out, as a result of which several of the miners signed a 'disclamation' which they later tried to repudiate. The lawyer who dealt with the case stated that "it is probable a Lady of great Beauty of Address might prevail with some of the old Coalziers to sign any paper."

The Eglinton miners in the 1749 dispute appear to have acted peaceably, causing no damage to pit-headgear, pumps, etc. Despite their good behaviour they were accused of being "so many mutinous and unruly Coaliers who had ... without any just Cause or Colour deserted their Masters work". The employers also warned the courts of the dire consequences of leniency.

In 1799 the Fergushill barony became the property of the 12th Earl of Eglinton and Winton, and the Fergushill miners were sold with the land, a normal practice for the time. The workers owned their bodies, however the Earl owned their labour and quitting their work was regarded as theft. This arose from an infamous labour Act of 1606 (Anent Coilyearis and Saltaris, c. 2).

The Earl of Eglinton claimed to have given up a valuable colliery in 1766 due to the loss of profits caused by miners demands and labour practices.

The bondage under which the miners (and Salters) worked was not removed until acts of Parliament in 1775 & 1799. By 1882 it was illegal for boys and girls below the age of ten to work in the mines.

== Transportation ==
=== Internal ===
Within the early mine tunnel or roads, coal was loaded into hutches which were dragged on skids, sometimes on wooden plank-ways, however at the earl's colliery near Redburn small unsaleable coal was packed to form a smooth surface, a cheaper alternative to the use of wood.

=== External ===
==== Roads ====
Coal was at first carried on pack animals in panniers as the roads before the late 18th century were not suitable for wheeled vehicles. As a result of this, canals, waggonways and railways were developed.

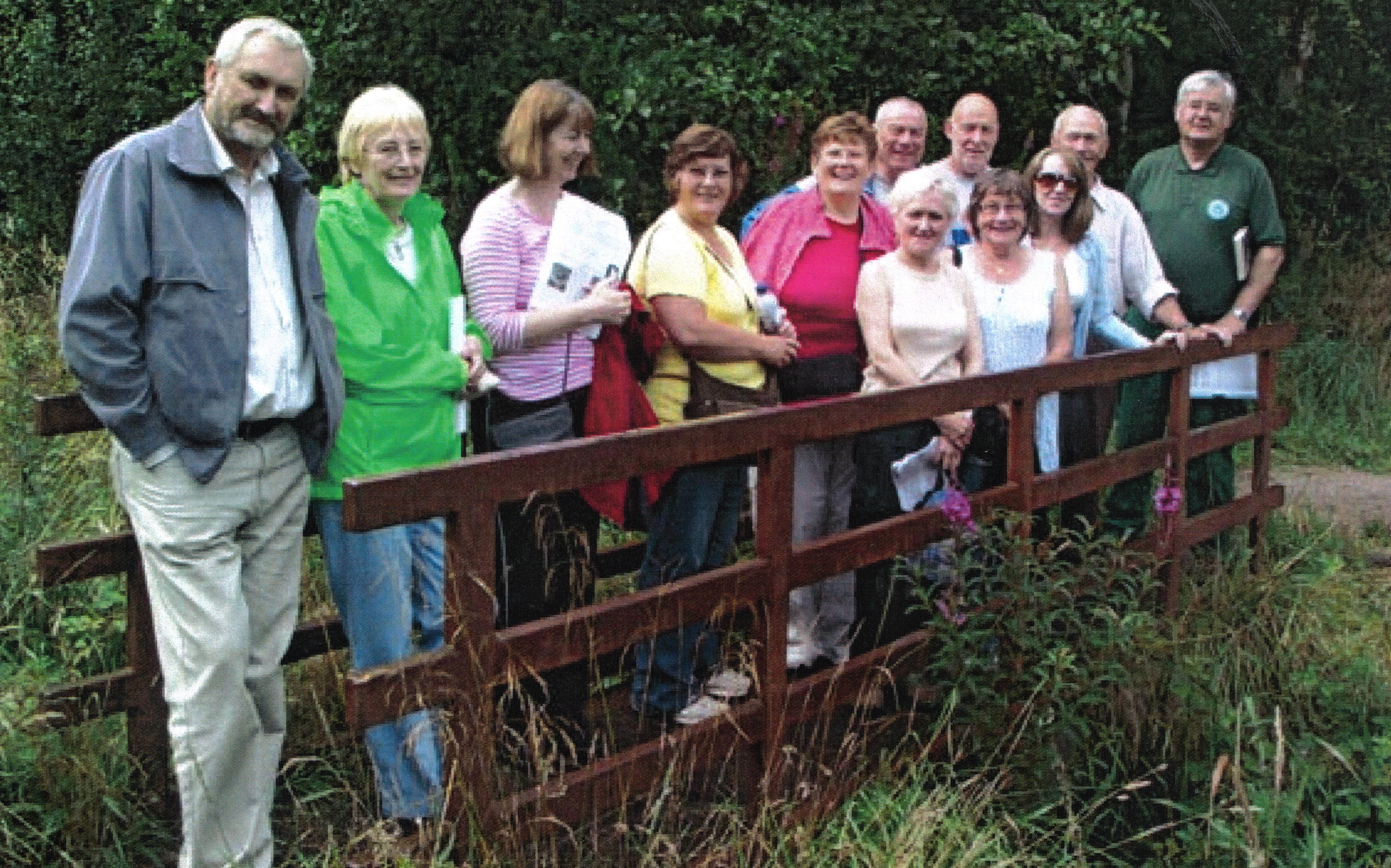
The Drukken Steps with an event run by the Irvine Burns Club

One route for coal transport from Armsheugh and Doura was via the Drukken Steps, stepping stones on the course of the 1774 Toll Road, which ran from the west end of Irvine through Eglinton to Kilwinning via Milnburn or Millburn; crossing the Red burn near Knadgerhill. and running passed 'The Higgins' cottage, (now demolished).55°37.902′N 004°39.355′W

In 1805 the Earl obtained permission to turnpike the road that ran through the Eglinton estate to the village of Saltcoats and its harbour. He used his own workforce to maintain the road and his expenses were covered by levying toll charges at the toll barriers he constructed. The transport of 'Cunninghame' coal was a major and disputed source of income.

==== Canals ====
In the 1840s a short canal carried coal from the colliery at Snodgrass to the Garnock and beyond. The Montgomeries were intent on creating a major harbour at Ardrossan and they intended to make it the principal port for Glasgow by building a canal link to Glasgow; the Glasgow, Paisley and Johnstone Canal. Construction from the Glasgow end began in 1807 and the first boat, the passenger boat, The Countess of Eglinton, was launched in 1810; completion to Glasgow's Port Eglinton from Paisley was achieved in 1811, but the section to Ardrossan was never built.

==== Waggonways ====
As early as 1725 a waggonway was planned and possibly built from a Fergushill coal pit to Irvine Harbour.

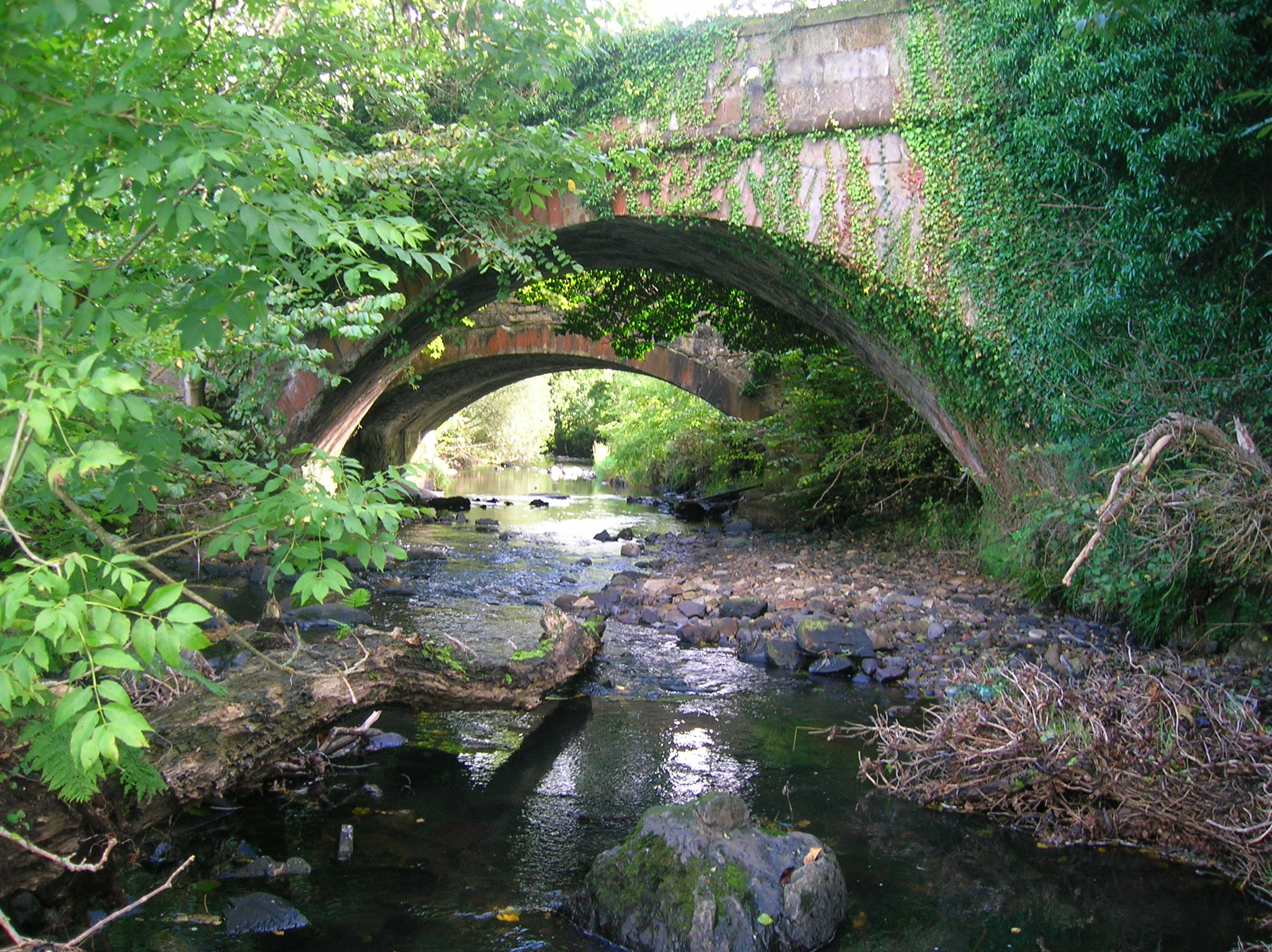
The 19th-century waggonway bridge (foreground) over the Lugton Water near Fergushill farm. The two bridges were known as the 'Elbo and chael', 'Elbow and child.'

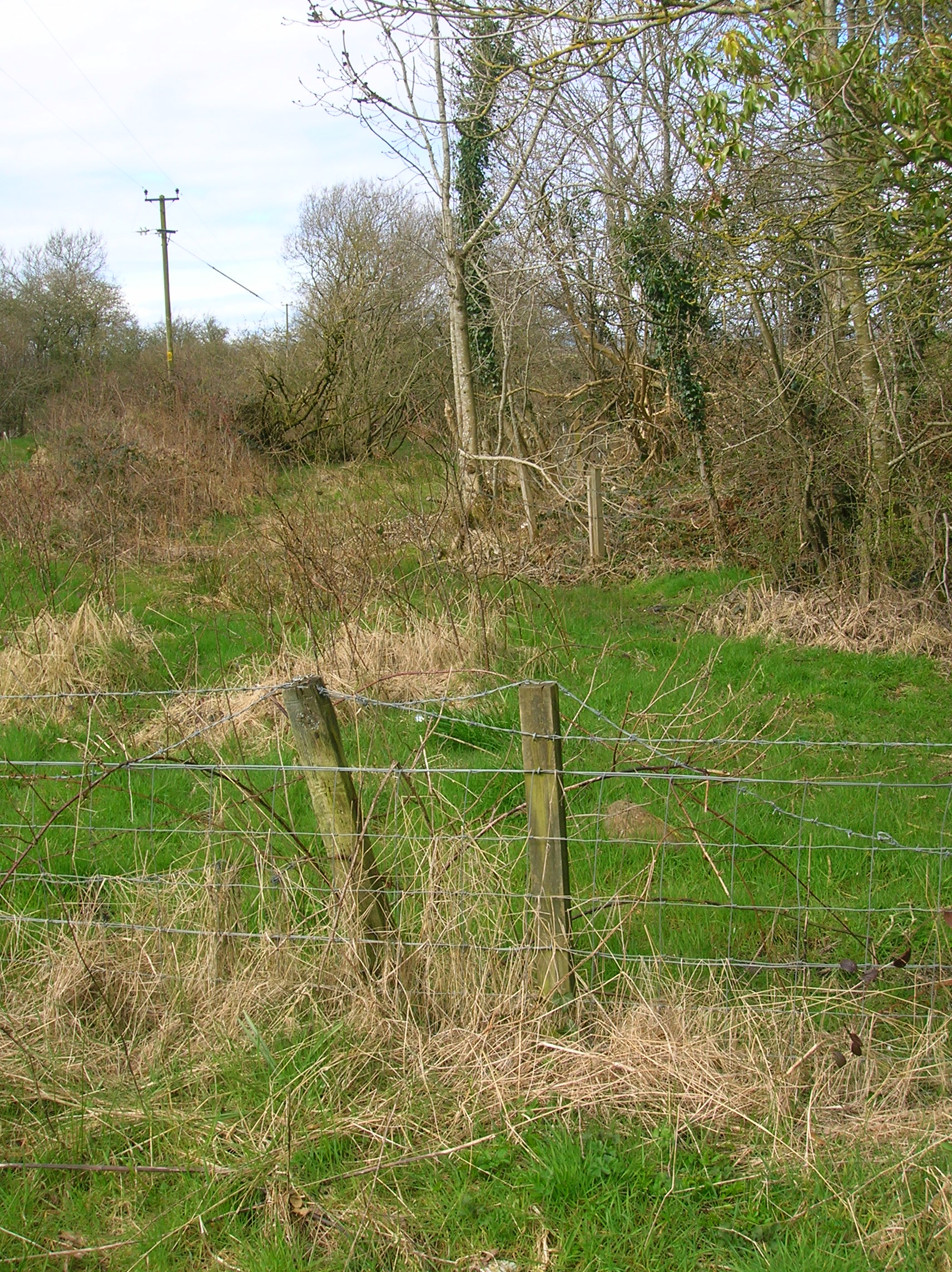
The course of the waggonway from Millburn drive looking towards Kilwinning.

The Ardrossan and Johnstone Railway was built by the Glasgow, Paisley and Johnstone Canal company as a waggonway between Ardrossan harbour and Kilwinning which opened in 1831. It was initially built to the Scotch gauge of 4 ft 6 in (1,372 mm) and was worked by horses. It had a passenger services worked by a carriages, which held 24 passengers; 16 inside and 8 outside. The 3-mile (4.8 km) long Doura branch left the main line north of Stevenston (Dubbs Junction) and ran east (past where the Glasgow, Paisley, Kilmarnock and Ayr Railway later crossed over it) to a bridge crossing the River Garnock just before the Dirrans sawmill. From there it ran northeast (on an embankment beside Bannoch Road) to reach the Doura pit.

The 0.5-mile (0.80 km) North Fergus Hill branch left the Doura branch at South Fergushill, just after the Lugton Water crossing to reach the Fergus Hill coal pit. Crossing gates were located at Dirrans, Corsehill, Saughtrees and Fergushill. Clonbeith siding was located near the Fergushill gates. The Fergushill drive entrance into the Eglinton Estate passed Chapelholm Woods was carried over the railway by a bridge; this has since been demolished.

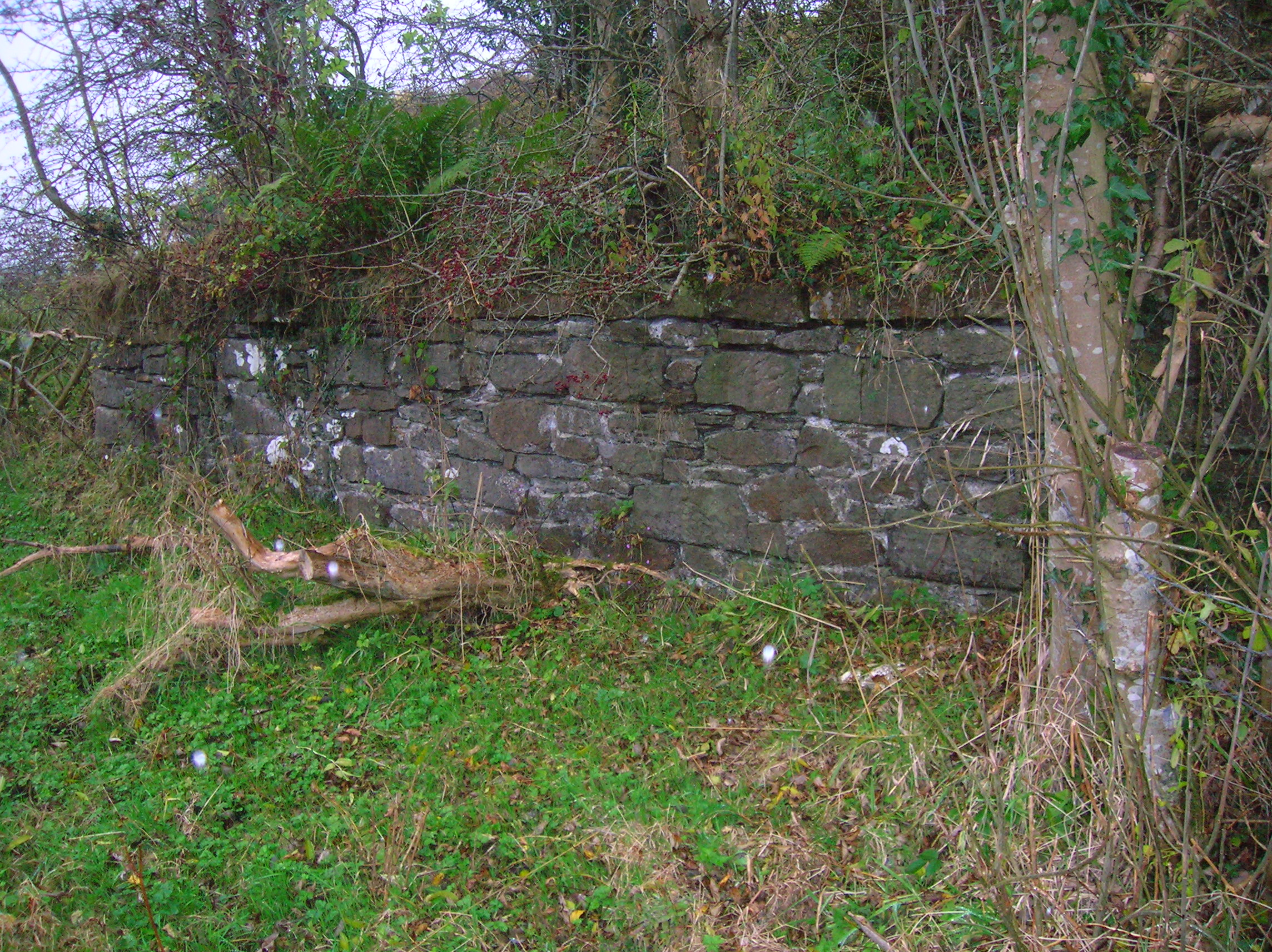
An old loading dock at the Benslie coup, on the closed and lifted Doura waggonway branch

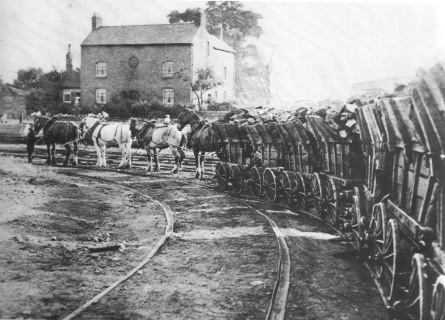
A typical wagonway, the Little Eaton Gangway

In 1833 Sir James Cunningham extended the Doura branch to his extensive coal and fireclay workings at Perceton. Up until the 1850s this line was worked using horse haulage. Each wagon carried about one ton of coal. The Doura branch was private until 1839 when the Ardrossan Railway Company came into being.

In 1836 60,000 tons of coal were carried to Ardrossan on the waggonway from the Earl's Kilwinning pits. Between 28 July 1834 and September 1835 over 21,000 people had been carried on the railway using the regular passenger service. By the late 1830s the annual figure was around 30,000.

A rare waggon-way bridge for the original 1.37 metres / 4 ft 6 in horse drawn railway (later relaid as standard gauge) still survives near South Fergushill farm on the B 785 Fergushill Road (see photograph), this being part of a 22-mile (35 km) long line that ran from the Doura pit to Ardrossan.

==== The Hurry ====
A 'Hurry' or loading dock was located at the end of Millburn Drive and later became a coup where rubbish from the Benslie Square miners dwellings was disposed of. The Hurry was served by the old Doura waggonway line and may have been built in relation to the carriage of items needed for the stands etc of the 1839 Eglinton Tournament from Ardrossan Harbour. In 1840 the old waggonway was replaced by a Standard Gauge railway that ran on a slightly different alignment and did not run in front of the Hurry's dock or to Doura. A short siding ran up to the end of a lane that ran down the western side of the Hurry where waggons could be parked for the unloading of materials such as fertiliser, etc. By 1895 this short siding had been lifted and the Hurry had become a coup and was starting to be grown over by trees. The loading dock wall is constructed from old red sandstone sleepers, each pierced by two holes.

==== Details of the ruins of the South Millburn Pit Cottage – 2007 ====
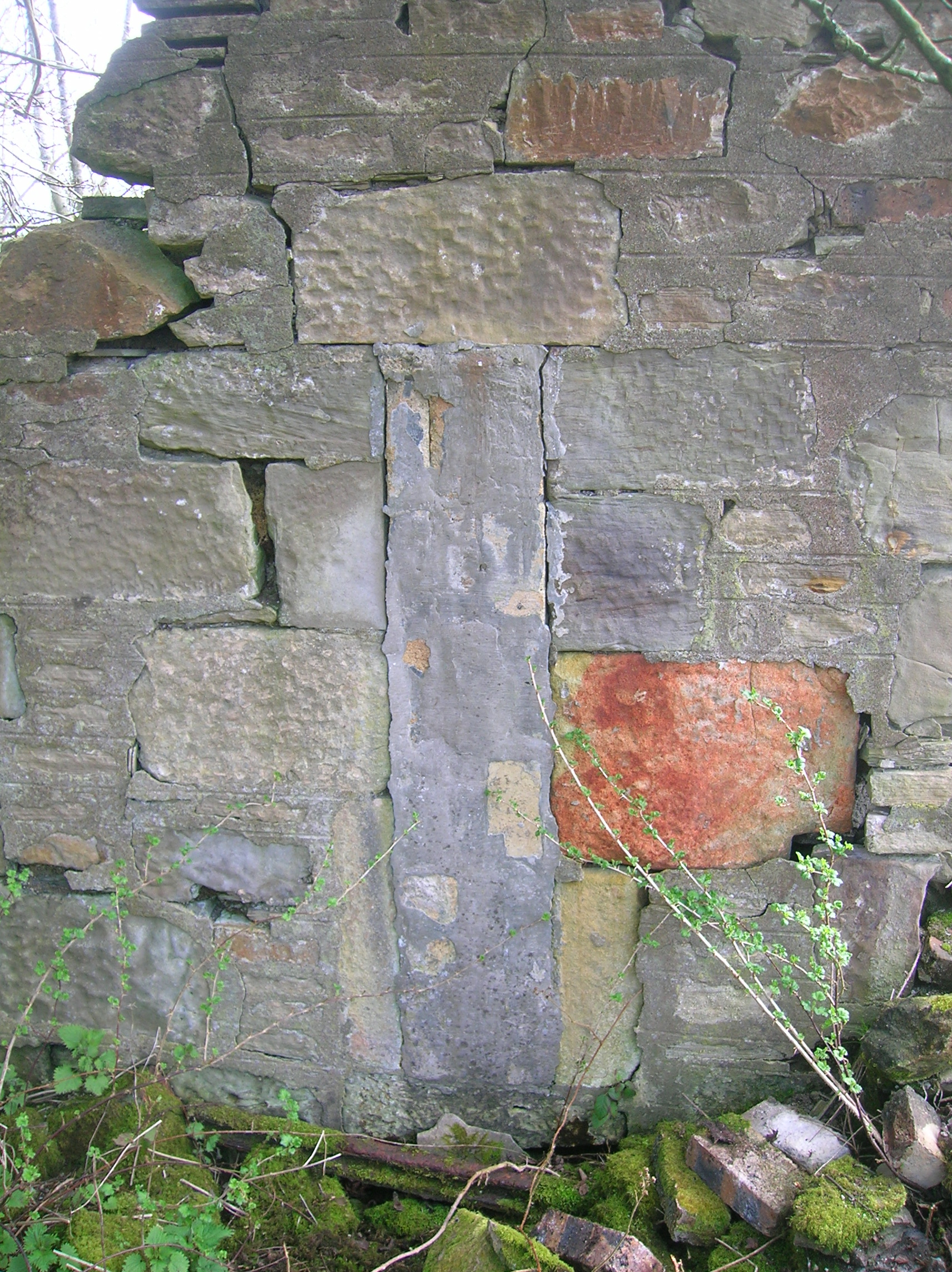
Gable end detail – facing towards Benslie

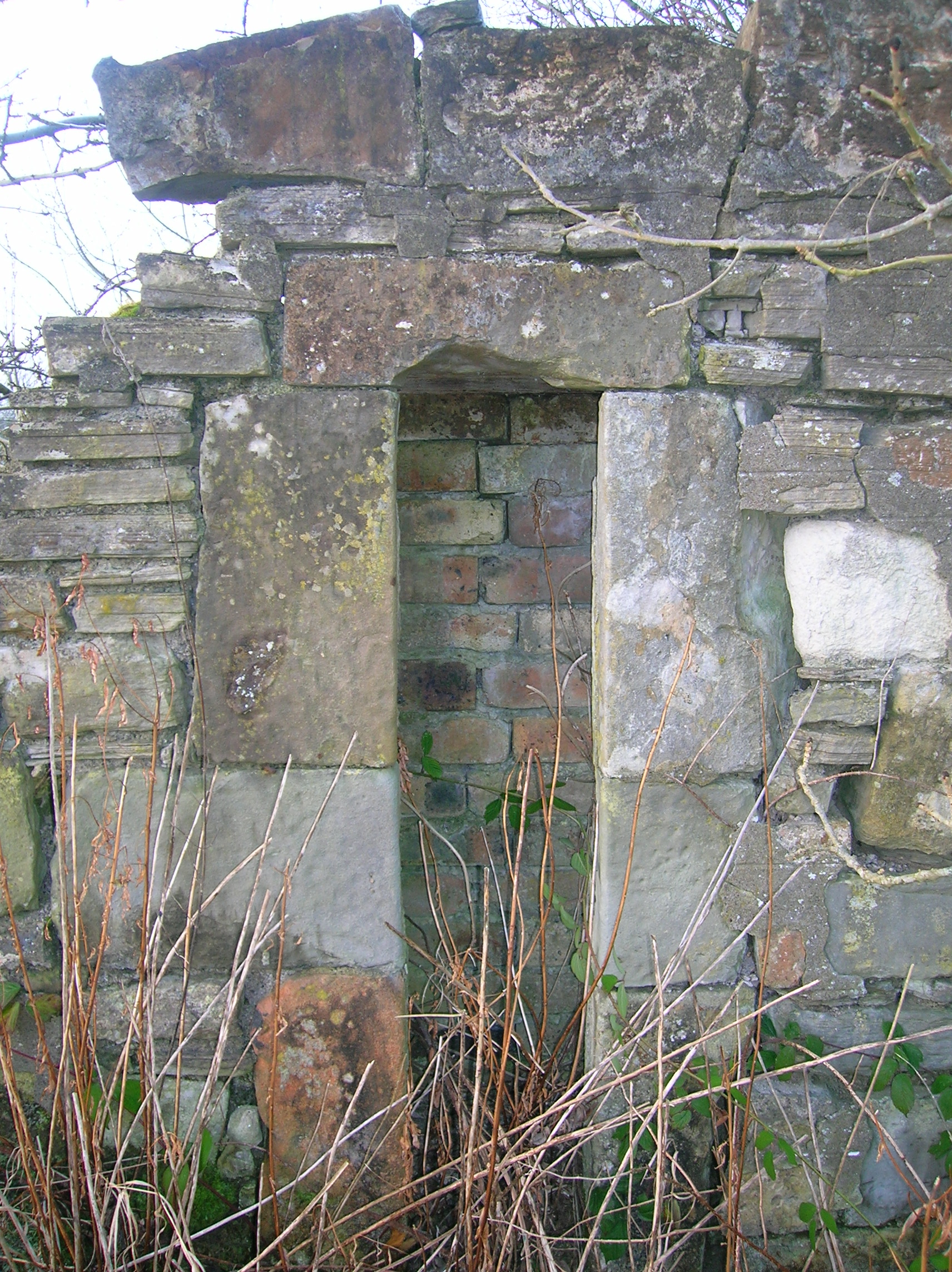
The highly unusual elongated window in the 'Auchenwinsey' facing end

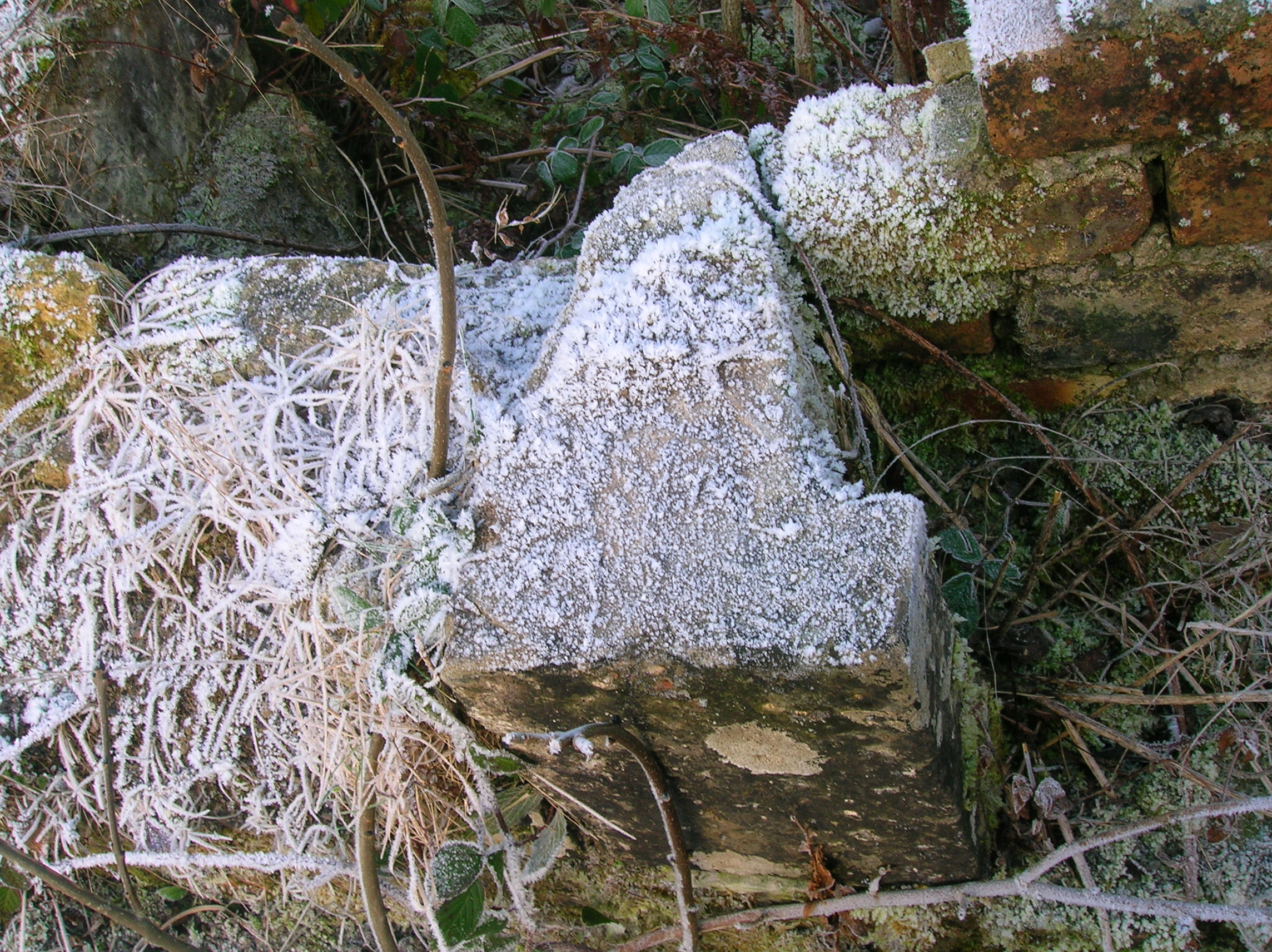
Detail of the high quality stonework on window facing towards Eglinton Country Park

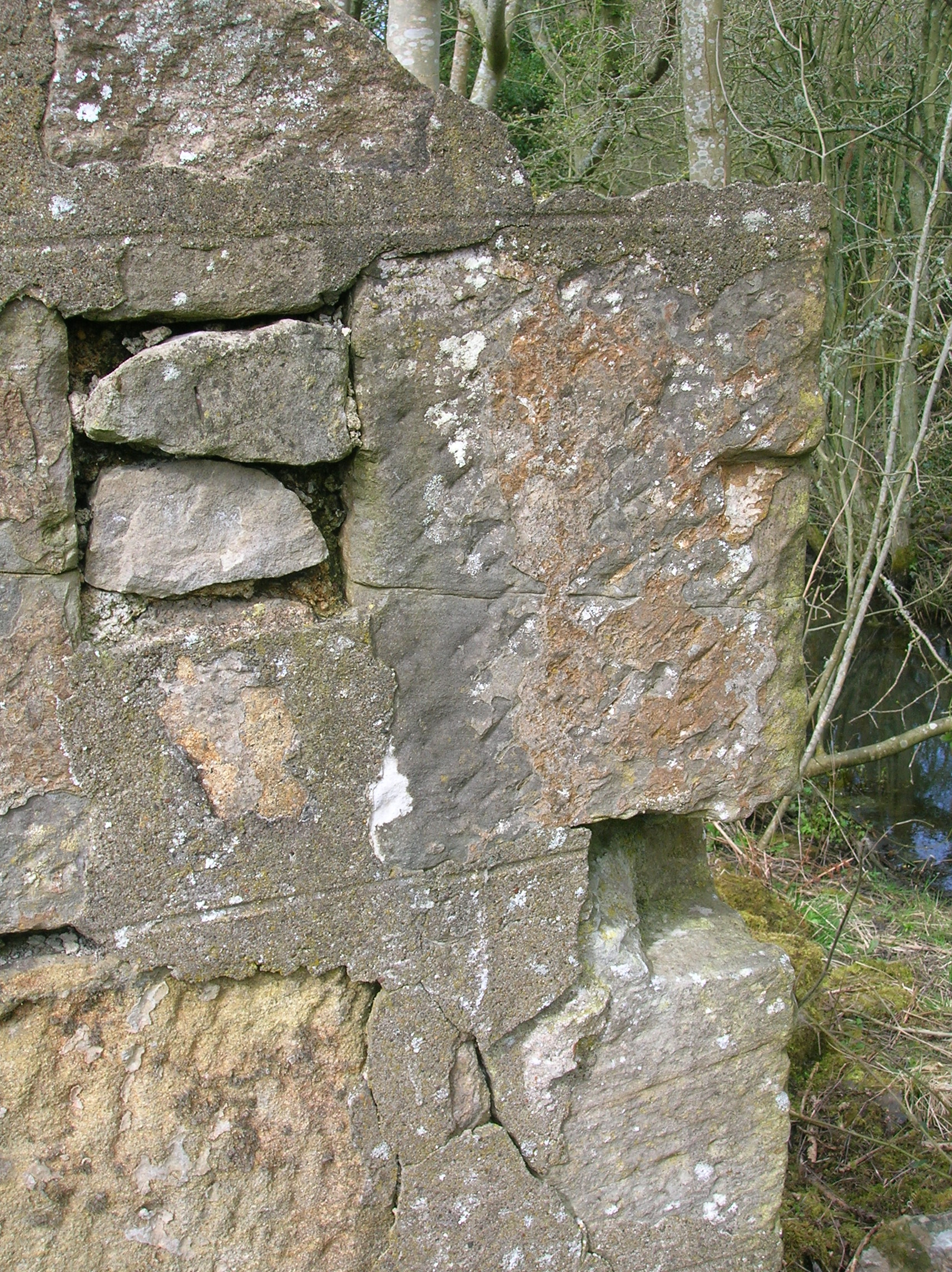
Re-used stones in the gable end wall

==== 1830s waggonway rail ====
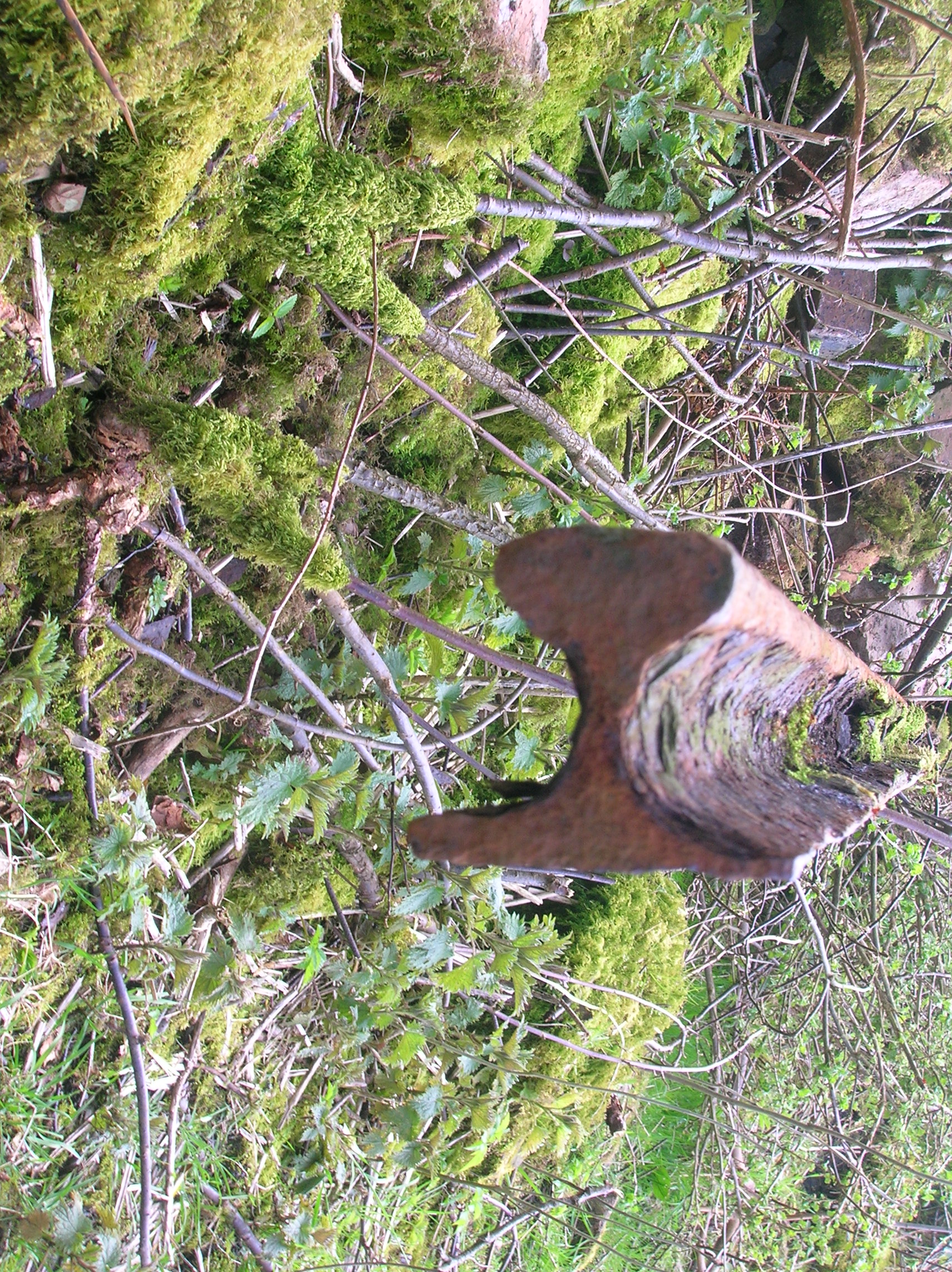
A flat bottomed and 15-foot (4.57 m) long section of Vignole rail from the 1834 Ardrossan and Johnstone Railway

A section of the light weight 1831 waggonway track survived at Millburn near Benslie and was recovered in 2009 for restoration and study.

This Vignole type section track has a large surface of contact with the sleeper and is therefore a flat-bottomed rail rather than double-headed, bull-headed, etc. It is 15 feet (4.57 m) long, typical of early rail lengths and has no holes for fishplates as these were not invented until after 1839; special joint-chairs were used at that time to hold the ends in place. The fishplate, originally without bolt holes, was invented by William Bridges Adams in May 1842 and used from 1849.

Holed red sandstone blocks and iron spikes have been found at Benslie showing that the wrought iron rails were held in place by iron spikes hammered into wood plugs in the stone sleepers. The rail height is much less than a typical modern rail as it was not designed to carry the weight of a locomotive. The rail dimensions are 2.5 inches (6.35 cm) high; 2.75 inches (6.99 cm) wide at the bottom (the foot); 1.5 inches (3.81 cm) wide at the top (the head). The central web is much shorter than that found on conventional rails.

==== Railways ====
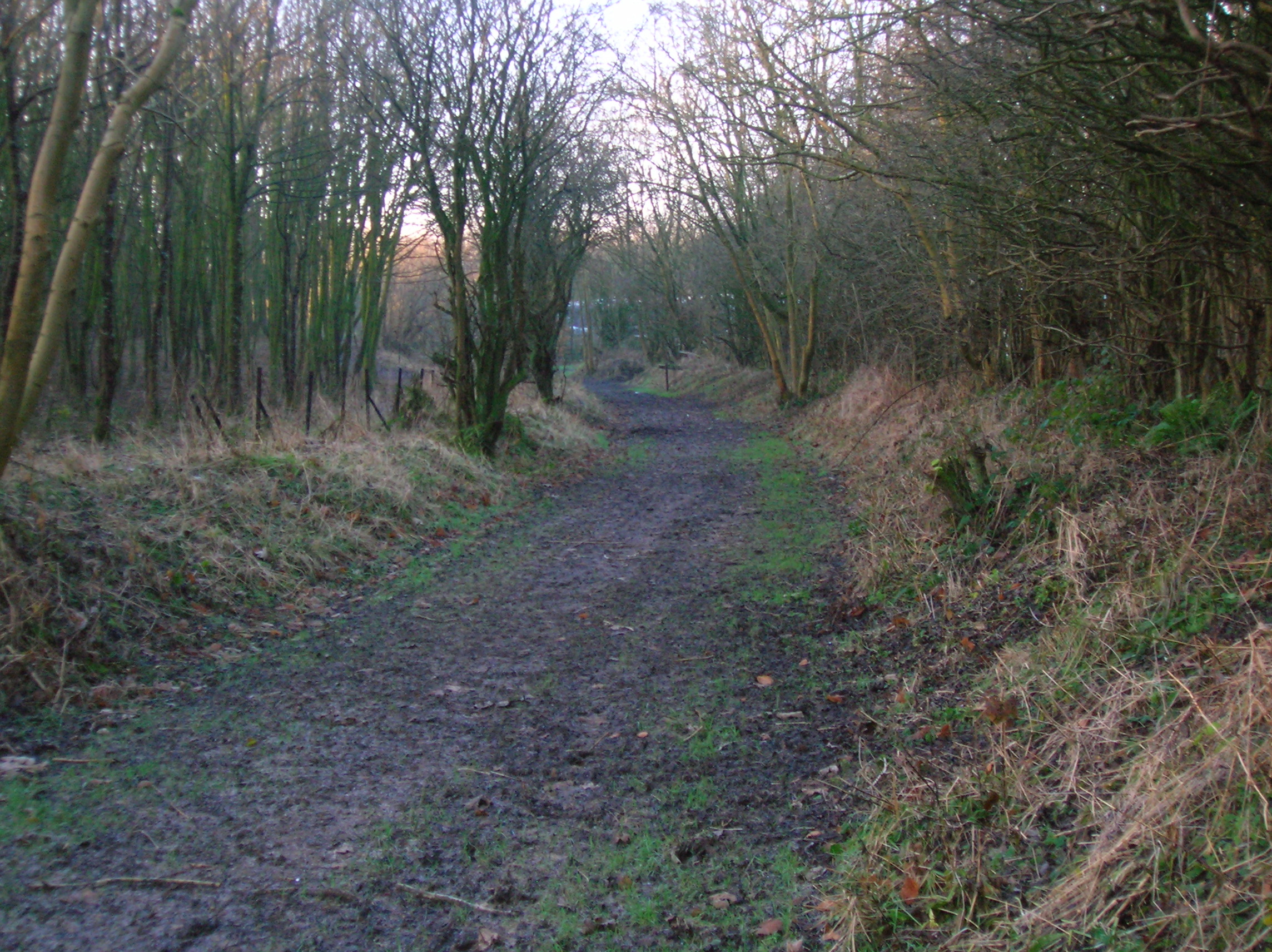
A section of old railway trackbed at Corsehillhead looking towards the Bannoch Road

The Doura branch was private until 1839 when the Ardrossan Railway Company came into being. The re-laying of track with a heavier rail and the gauge conversion from 4 ft 6 in (1.37 m) to 4 ft 8½ in was all carried out in a period of one week in 1840. The landowners had paid for the extension and the line had its gradients and curves altered to allow for locomotive working. In 1840 the line was connected with the Glasgow, Paisley, Kilmarnock and Ayr Railway at Kilwinning station; and in 1854 both lines merged with the new Glasgow and South Western Railway.

The first railway locomotives was 'Firefly', built by Barr and McNab of Paisley, followed in 1846 by two 2:2:2 types, 'Tam O'Shanter' and 'Soutar Johnnie'.

In 1845 Messrs. Taylor and Kenneth leased the earl's Moncur pits and agreed to transport three quarters of their coal via the railway and the port of Ardrossan.

Every colliery was linked by mineral lines to the main rail network and trackbeds, embankments, cuttings, bridges, etc are still evident in many places around Sourlie, Fergushill, Benslie, Auchenwinsey, Dirrens, etc.

The earl was a shareholder in the Kilmarnock and Troon Railway and therefore a joint owner with the Duke of Portland and Captain Boyle of Shewalton as the railway company was only the leaseholder.

== Harbours and shipping ==
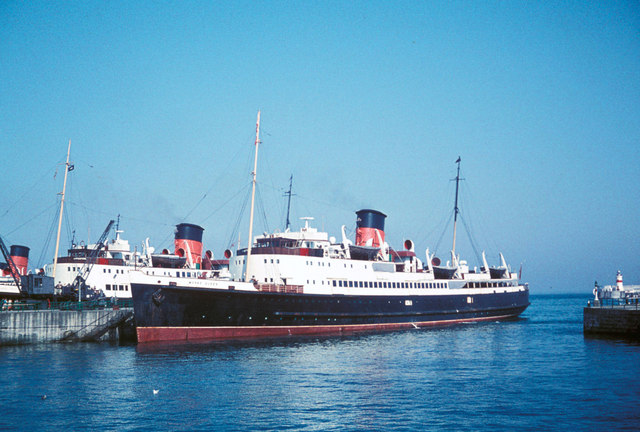
Ardrossan harbour with Isle of Man steamers in 1961

In the early 18th century the 9th Earl had contracts with a number of local shipmasters. The 12th Earl constructed Ardrossan Harbour for the Irish coal traffic.

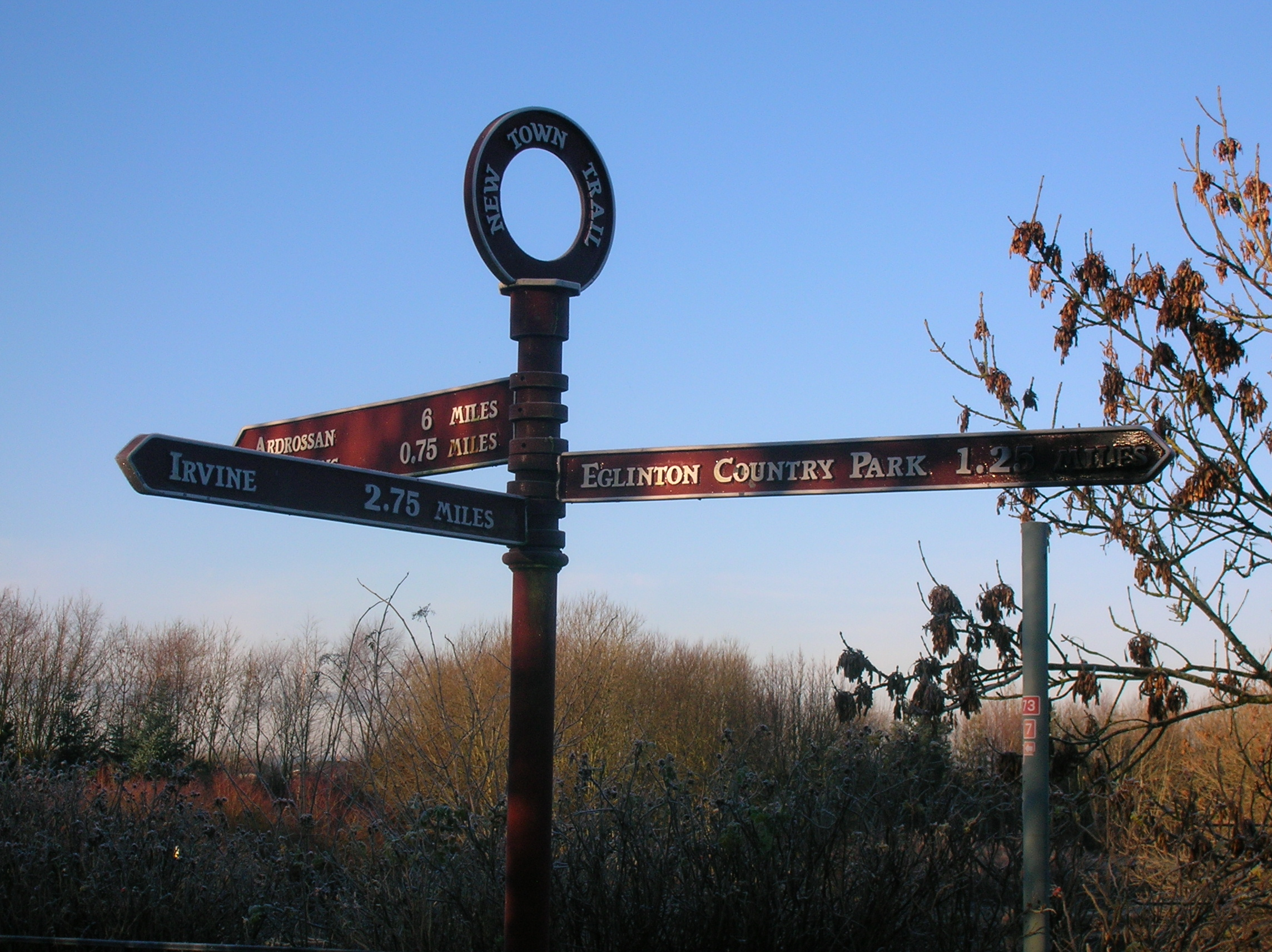
The New Town Trail runs through the park, partly along old railway routes

The Ardrossan harbour project was officially started on 31 July 1806. The navigation of the Clyde above the Cumbraes was difficult and up river of Port Glasgow, open only to small craft. In 1815, with over £100,000 having already been spent, and the contractors, Telford and Rennie pressing for £300,000 more, the works ceased. They were not restarted until 1833, after the death of the 12th Earl. The 13th Earl completed the harbour on a greatly reduced scale, the total cost amounting to £200,000. The completed harbour had two tidal basins of 6 and 18 acres (73,000 m^{2}), and a wet-dock of 4 acres (16,000 m^{2}).

The Earls owned the north part of Saltcoats harbour, the Cunninghame family owning the rest. Saltcoats was a very busy harbour in the 18th century and problems with silting, together with legal conflicts made the 12th Earl decided on developing his harbour and town of Ardrossan instead.

== Other industries and miscellaneous infrastructure ==
In the Chapelholms wood the 1938 map marks a hydraulic ram and cistern in a bend of the Lugton Water close to one of the old Fergushill collieries. Hydraulic rams harness the flow or current force of water to pump a portion of the water being used to power the pump to a point higher than where the water originally started. Rams were often used in remote locations, since it requires no outside source of power other than the kinetic energy of falling water.

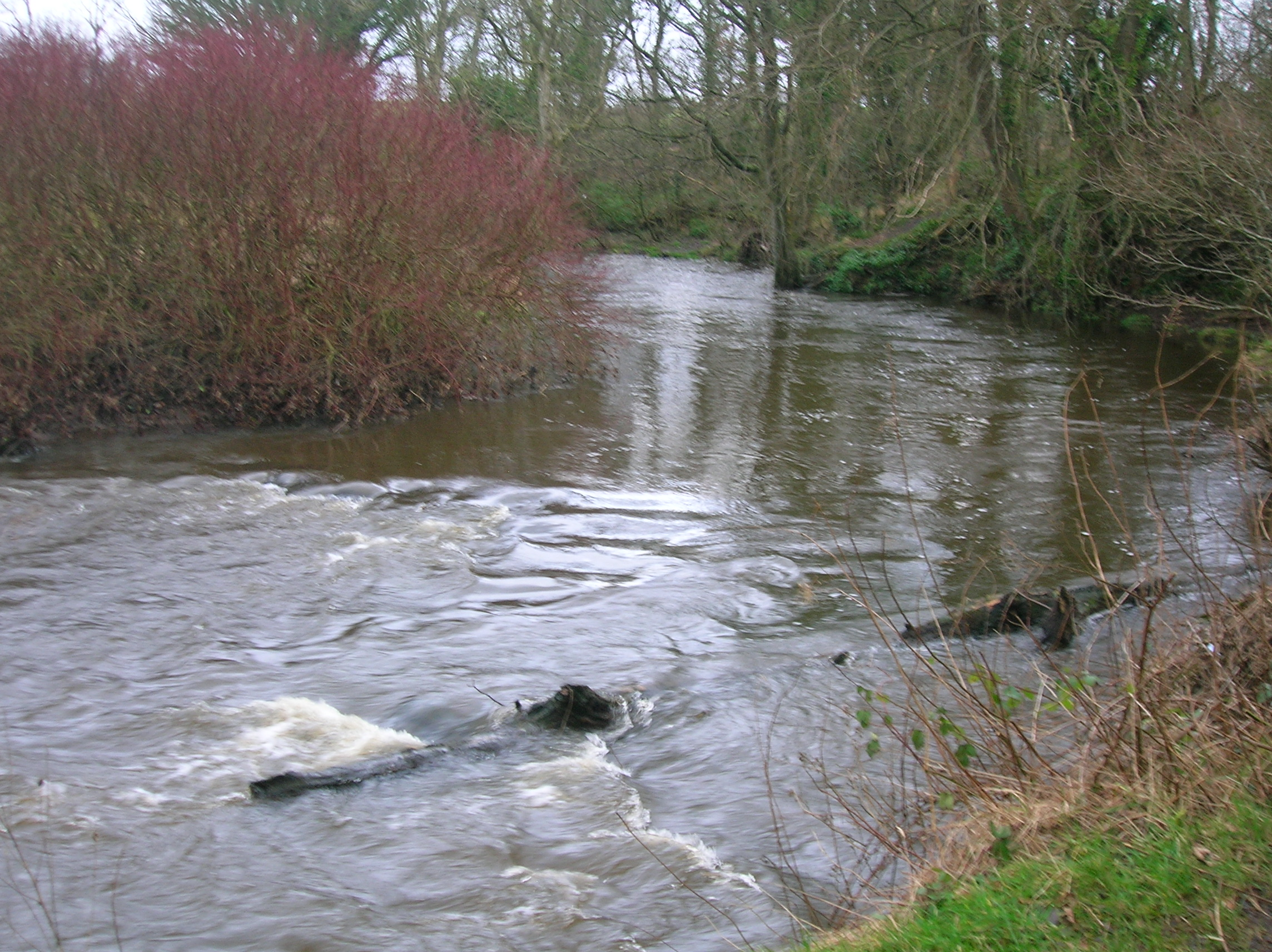
The old mill weir on the Lugton Water at Fergushill

As stated, a fairly substantial brick-lined tunnel still survives which once carried a standard gauge railway line unobtrusively to Lady ha' colliery, out of the Earl's sight and the smoke kept away from the kitchen gardens' greenhouses and plants.

The 1850s OS map shows a forge and a smithy at Buckreddan off the Bannoch Road.

The placename 'Red Boiler' near Fergushill marked the site where steam boilers from the collieries were scoured out and then reused.

Steam boilers are marked on OS maps at a number of the collieries, such as Redstone.

A water powered sawmill and also coke ovens were located at the Dirrans.

Roy's 1747 map shows a Lugton Mill near the junction of the Lugton Water and the River Garnock. In 1814 a flour mill was located at Fergushill, on the Eglinton Castle side of the Lugton Water upstream of the bridge; a miller's house was situated on the other side of the river. The building of the waggonway and bridge seems to have resulted in the demolition of this house.

== Miners and workers rows or villages ==
Miners rows were built at Bartonholm, Corsehill, Snodgrass, Blacklands, Sourlie, Dirrans, Longford, Annick Lodge, Nethermains, Shipmill, Fergushill, Doura and Benslie. Douglas records the Eglinton Iron Works village as having 1,014 occupants in 1874.

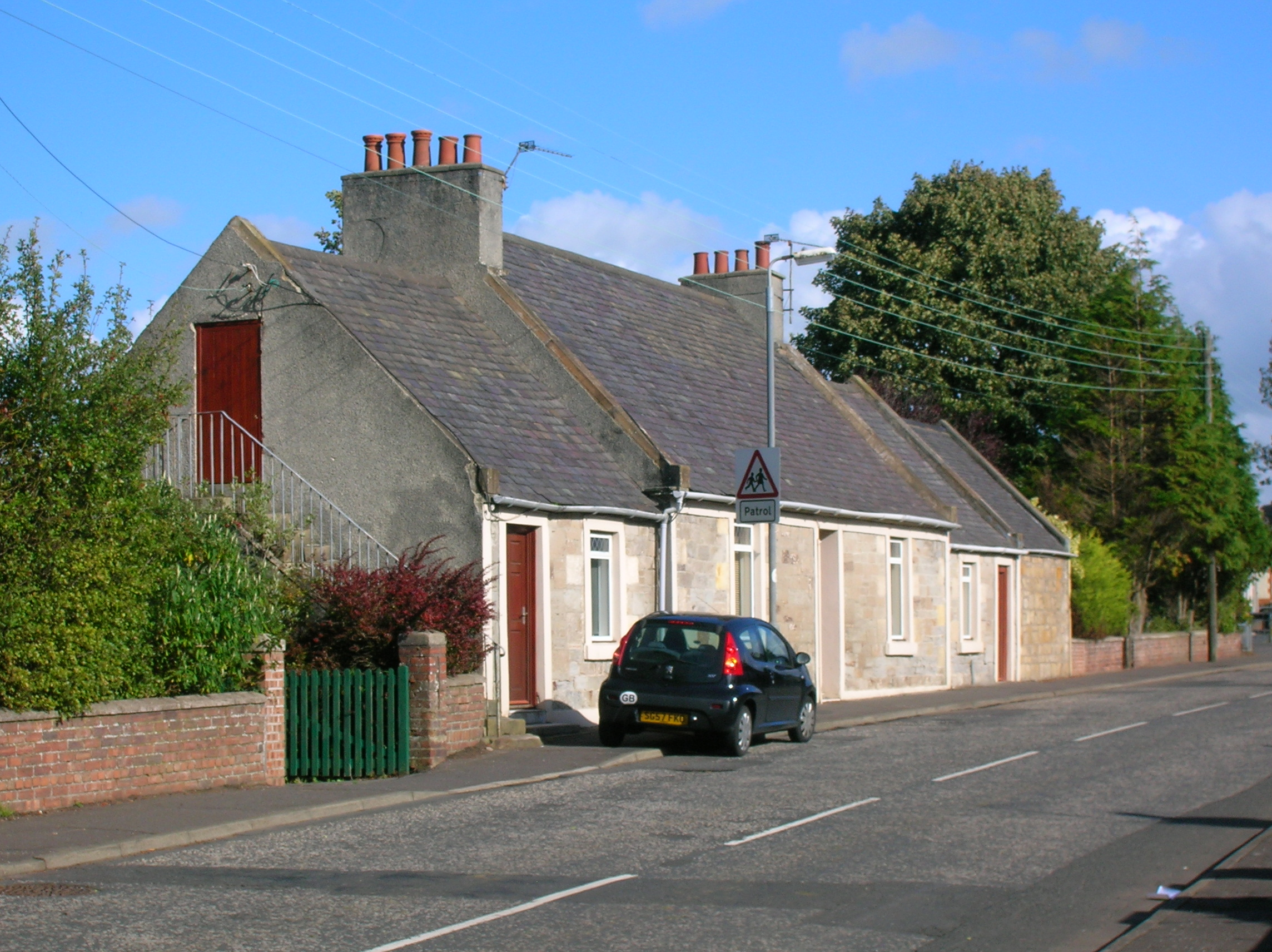
Kenneth's Castle, dwelling of a mine manager.

A number of collier's, hewer's or miner's rows existed close to the various collieries and the ironworkers had a 'village' at the Blacklands and at Byrehill near Kilwinning from 1850 to the 1930s. The village had a double row of forty-two apartment houses, a cross row of fifteen similar houses, and a single row of sixty single apartment houses. Another row, called the Brick Row, had thirty-four houses in it. One store was provided.

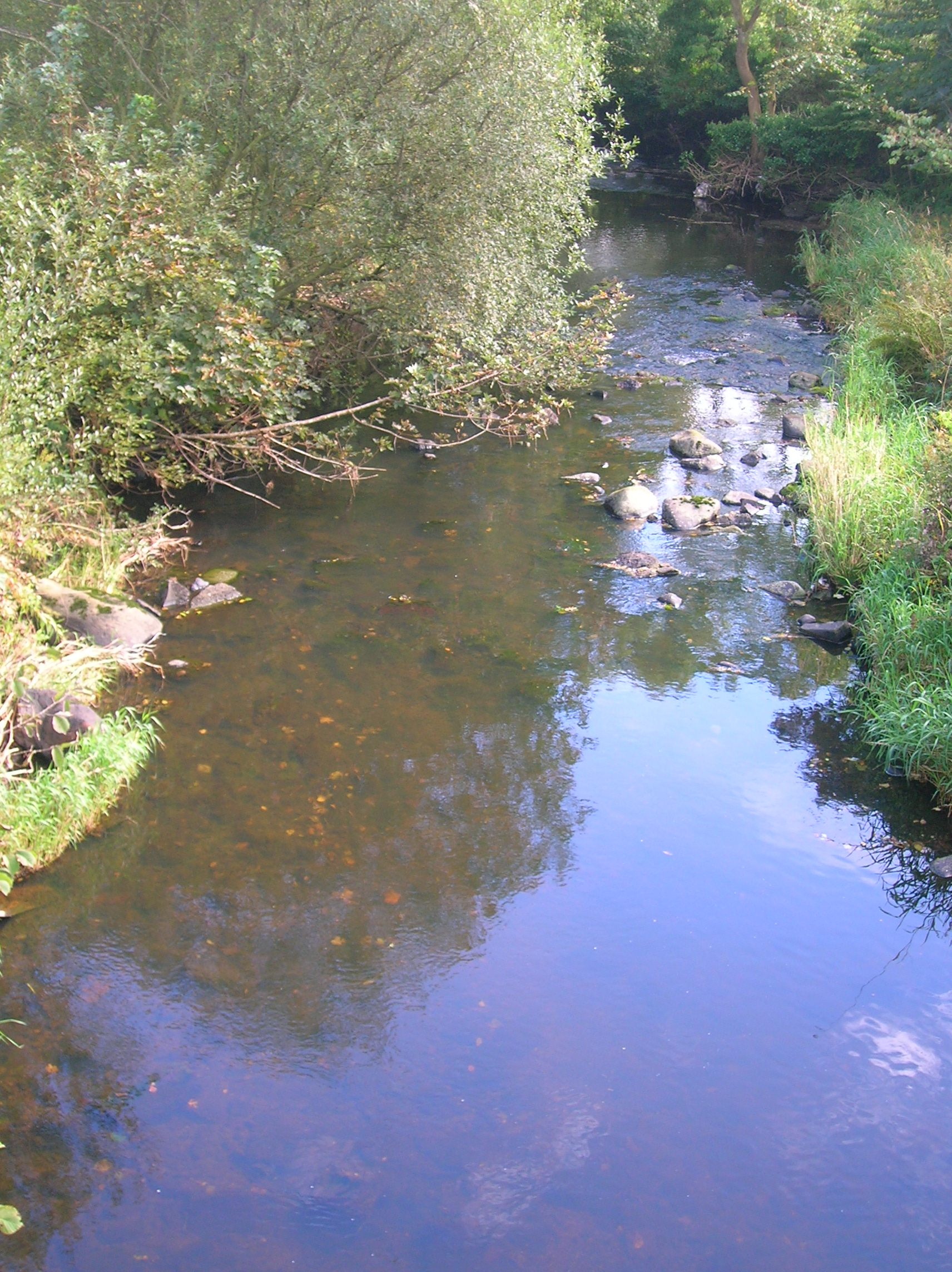
The Lugton Water from the Lugton Bridge at Fergushill, near to the old Waggonway bridge.

In 1874 Dobie records that a miner's village called Fergushill existed with a population of 531. Groome refers to the colliers village as having been established in around 1835.

Fergushill miners' village, was owned by Messrs. Finnie & Son. It was composed of 7 rows of cottages. There were ten thatched cottages. In 1913 63 persons lived here. One room, measuring 9 by 6 feet (2.7 by 1.8 m), held thirteen persons. The rows had names like Wellington and Burn. At one time there were 78 houses in the village, with a population of 363. It was demolished and nothing now remains at the site, other than North Fergushill farm.

Benslie's miners rows, the 'Benslie Square', were made up of 57 stone built miners houses, like Fergushill, owned by A. Finnie and Son. Coalmasters. In 1913 the village was said to be 67 years old. The population was 318 in 1881. At first the houses only existed at the 'Square' and then later the village was extended towards the road which runs up passed the church. A number of coal pits were in the area as shown by the first edition OS map, one pit being close to the 'Millburn Cottage' opposite South Millburn. In 1937 most of the miner's rows were demolished and the miners were moved to the Dirrans.

A dwelling near South Millburn was known as the South Millburn Pit House in 1871 and after the pit had closed it became known as Millburn Cottage

Collier's rows are marked on OS maps at Corsehill, where the Eglinton Colliery school was also located.

== Clayworks ==
=== Fergushill tileworks ===
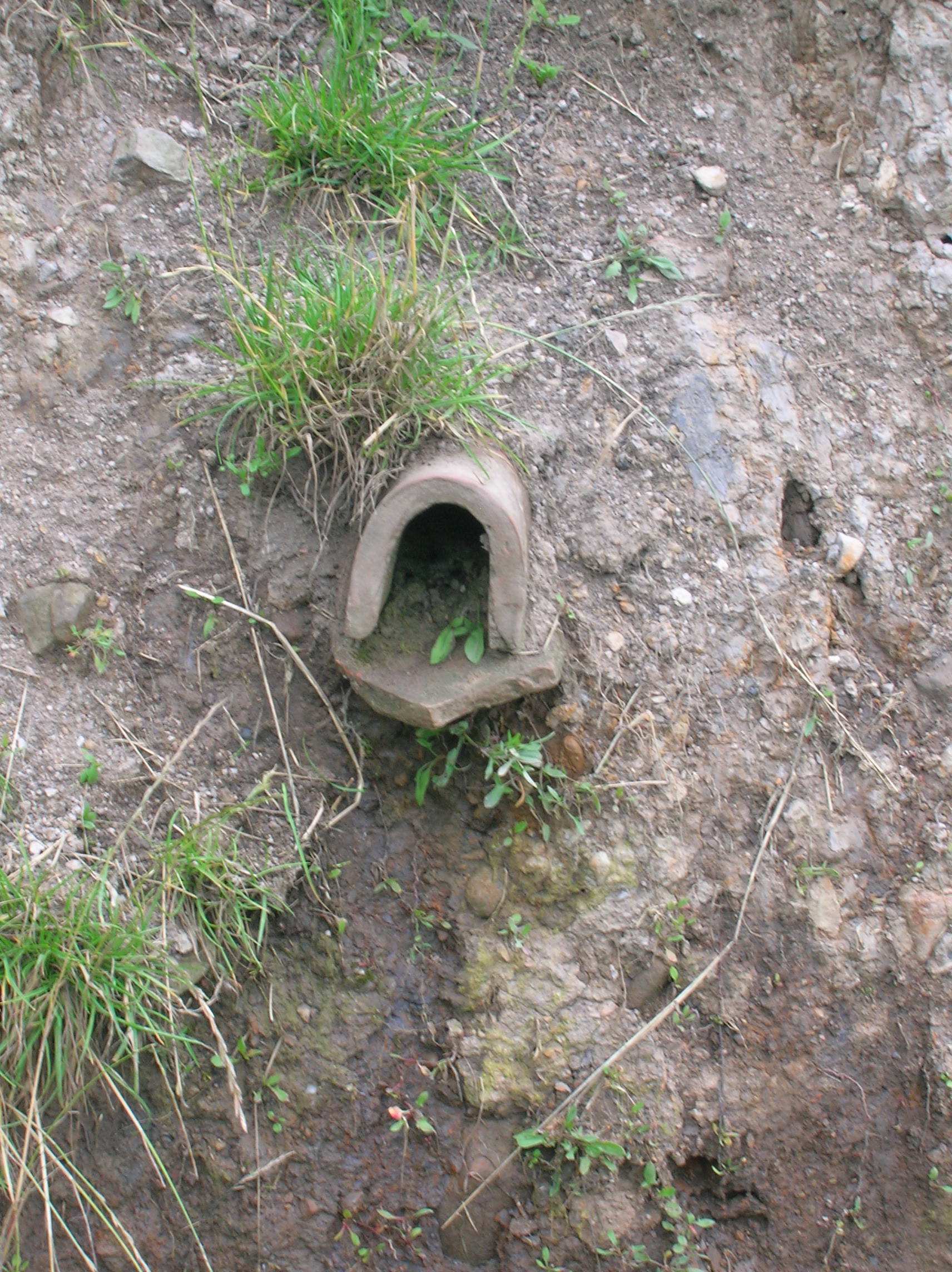
Typical mug and sole drain (Scotland, 18th century) from South Auchenmade moss

These tileworks was built in 1831 at North Fergushill farm and consisted of a moulding room, kiln and drying stores. The tileworks were in a field just to the east of an unclassified road between North Fergushill farm and the old Dalry to Kilmarnock railway line. The first manager of the Tilework appears to be a Hugh Bunton or Buntine. Bunton probably lived at the adjacent Tilework Cottage. From September 1836 to the end of 1837 the Eglinton Estate purchased between 5,000 and 10,000 tiles per month for use on its farms.

The fate of the tileworks is revealed in the memoranda from George Johnston, the Earl of Eglinton's factor, to the Earl's Commissioner, Mr Gairdner. By the end of 1852 demand for tiles had fallen considerably, production however was not reduced. George Johnston noted there were 480,000 unsold tiles stored at Fergushill and there was no room for the next year's stock. The 1855 OS map notes the tilework is disused. The old clay pit site is now a large pond, and Tilework Cottage is a privately owned house.

=== Eglinton Fireclay works ===
The OS map for the mid 18th century shows a clay mill, fireclay works and kilns at Buckreddan on the Bannoch Road. Fire clay is used in the manufacture of fire bricks. The clay is resistant to high temperatures and is suitable for lining furnaces, as fire brick, and manufacture of utensils used in the metalworking industries. Fireclay was also worked at Perceton.

=== Brickworks ===
A brickworks was located near Stobbs, close to the Eglinton Ironworks.

== Chlorine works ==
The OS map shows a Chlorine works located near the old loop of the River Garnock in the Redburn area.

== British Dynamite Factory ==
The Ardeer peninsula was the site of the massive dynamite manufacturing plant built here by Alfred Bernhard Nobel who had been searching for a suitably remote location to establish an explosives factory. In 1871 Nobel purchased 100 acres (40 ha) from the Earl of Eglinton, and established the British Dynamite Factory, and built what was at that time the largest explosives factory in the world.

== Saltpans ==
The Earl's owned part of Saltcoats harbour and kept saltpans there, fueled by the abundant local supplies of coal brought to the harbour along the turnpike which the Earl had built. The salt was relatively expensive, but was in demand during the Napoleonic Wars when imports were being prevented and were used in the manufacture of Dunlop cheese, butter and salted bacon.

== The Wilson canning factory ==
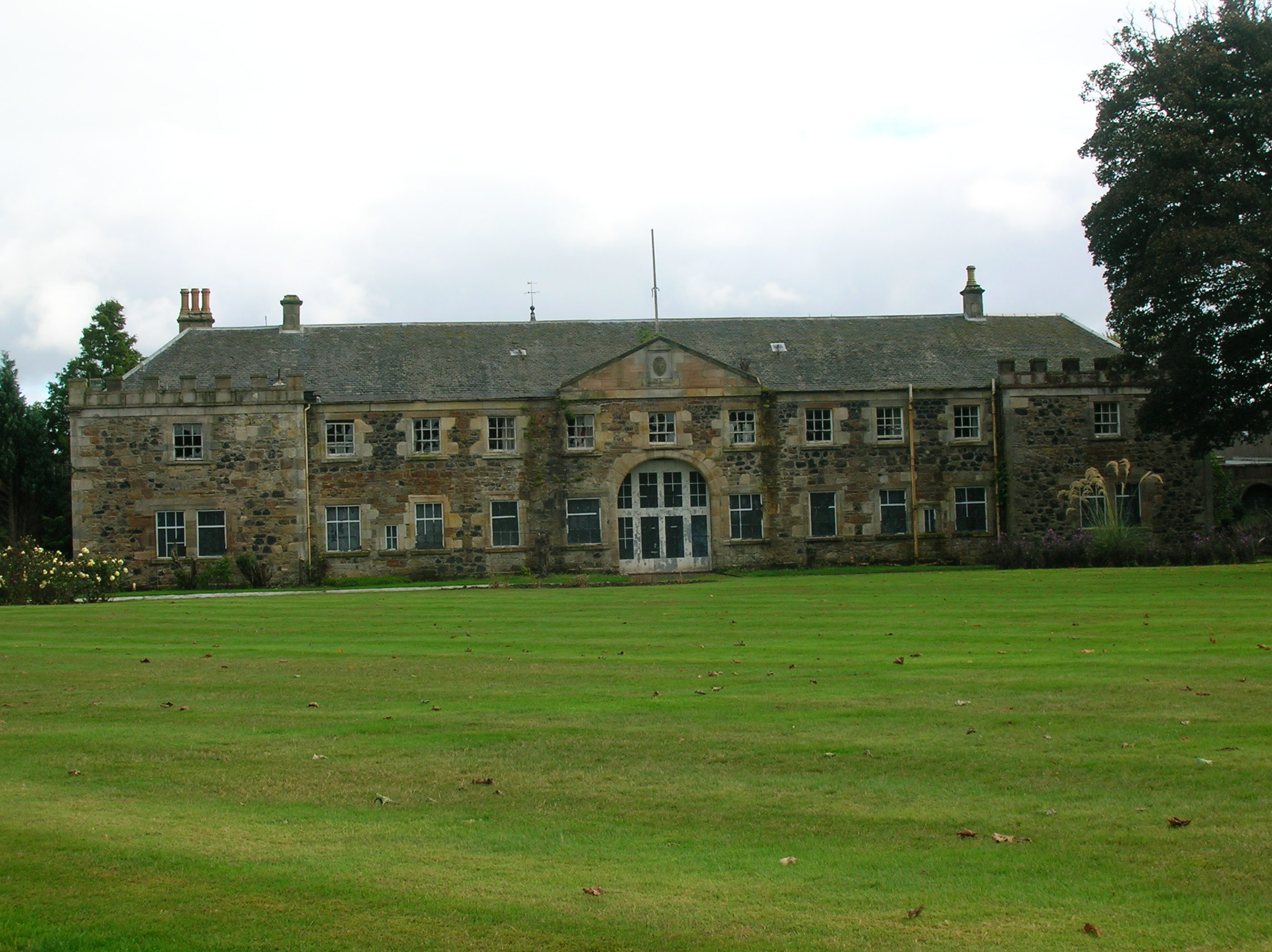
Adam's Block, once stables, coach house, estate offices and factory

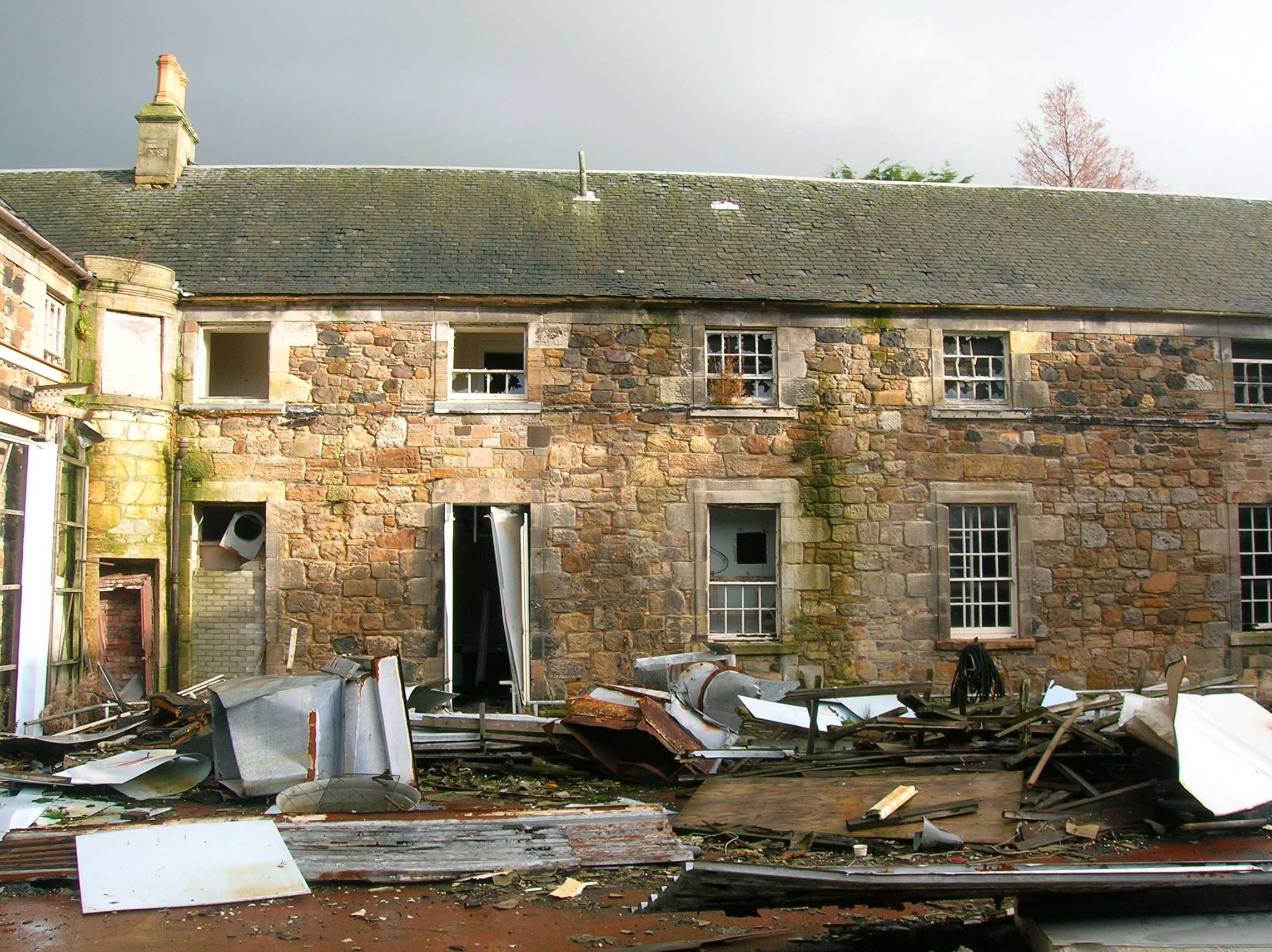
Inside the old factory courtyard

The Wilson family purchased the old offices, castle ruins, and other land from Robert Howie and Sons and the Eglinton factory was opened on 12 September 1958 by the Earl of Eglinton and Winton. Clement Wilson's food processing plant closed in the 1980s. The factory buildings were demolished in 2009, however the old stables were renovated and sold as private accommodation.

== Industrial interests elsewhere ==
=== Wool ===
In 1662 the earl was given the rights to the manual labour of all the vagrants and temporarily unemployed in Renfrewshire, Ayrshire and Galloway. These individuals were taken to the Earl's Burgh and Regality of Montgomeryston at the Citadel of Ayr where he had a wool factory. The parishes had to support the labourers while they were there and the earl only had to provide food and clothing. The earl's rights lasted for 15 years for the vagrants and five years for the unemployed. The business was not a success as it disappears from the records after a relatively short period of time.

=== Brewing ===
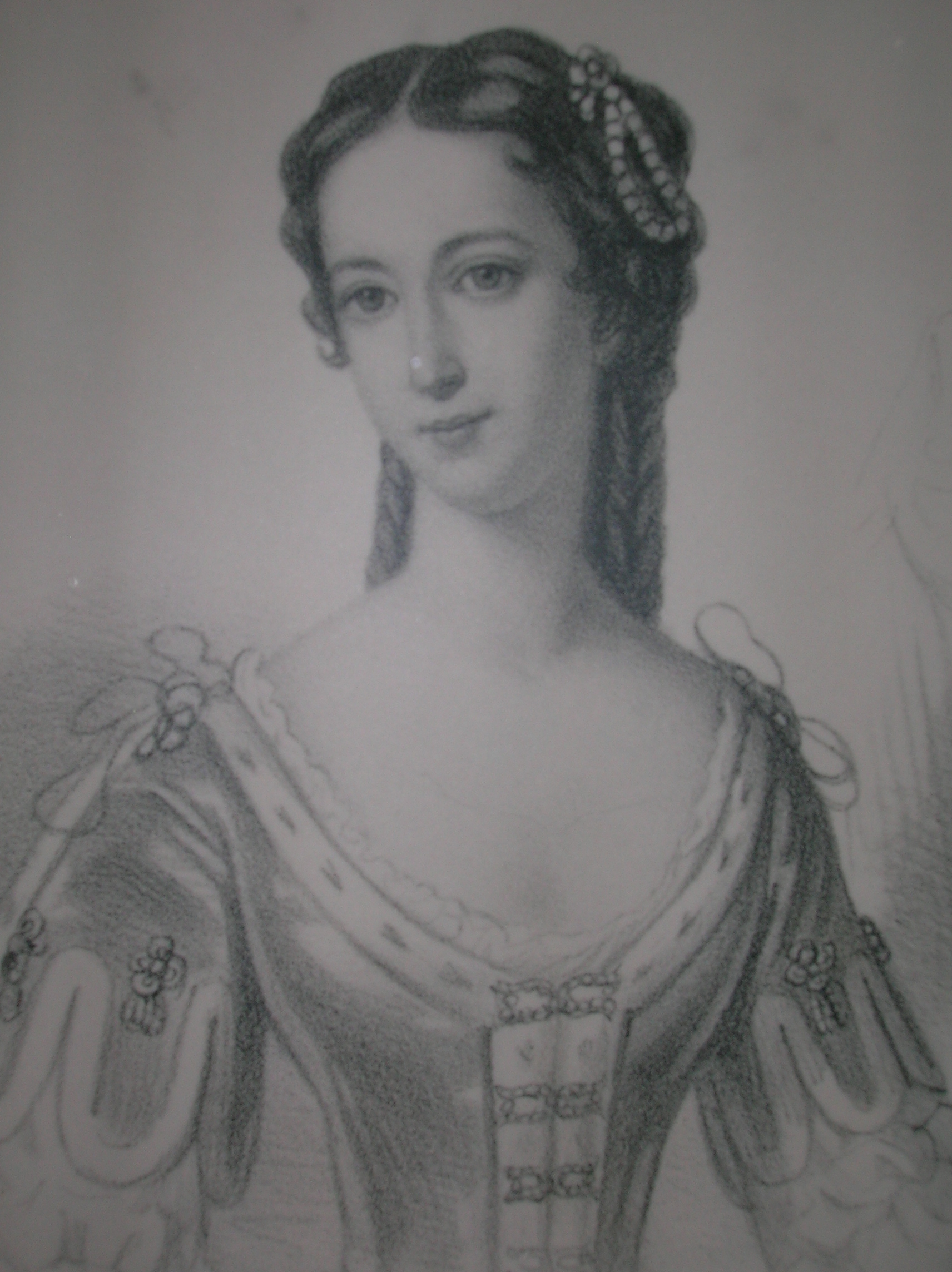
Susanna Montgomery

Susanna Montgomery, Countess of Eglinton, wife of the 9th Earl of Eglinton, was industrious and established a brewery at Montgomerieston, a small Burgh of Regality, inside the walls of Cromwell's old fort at Ayr, to increase her income. It seems to have been successful.

=== Silk and cotton weaving ===
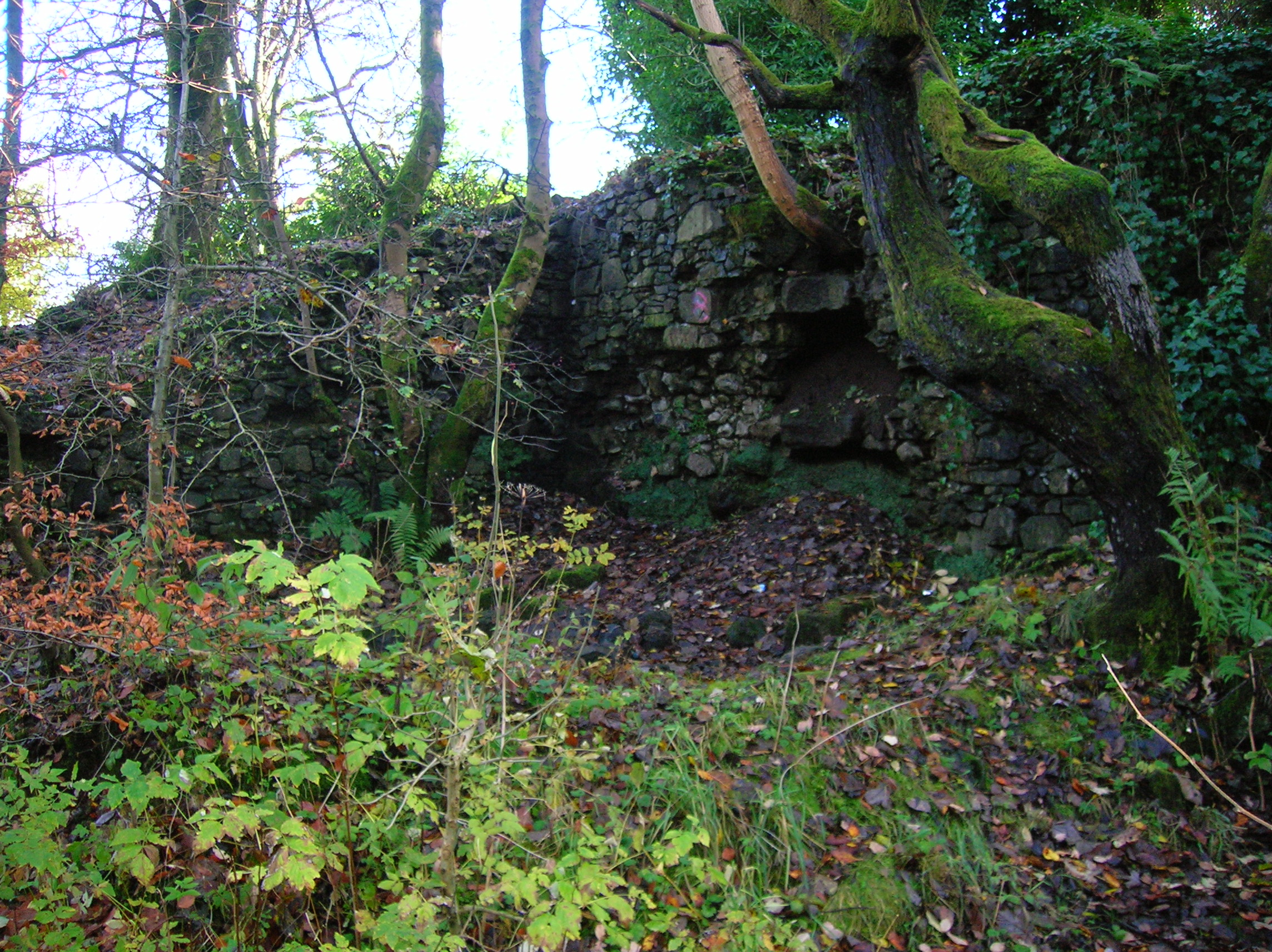
Ruins of the Eaglesham Cotton Mill

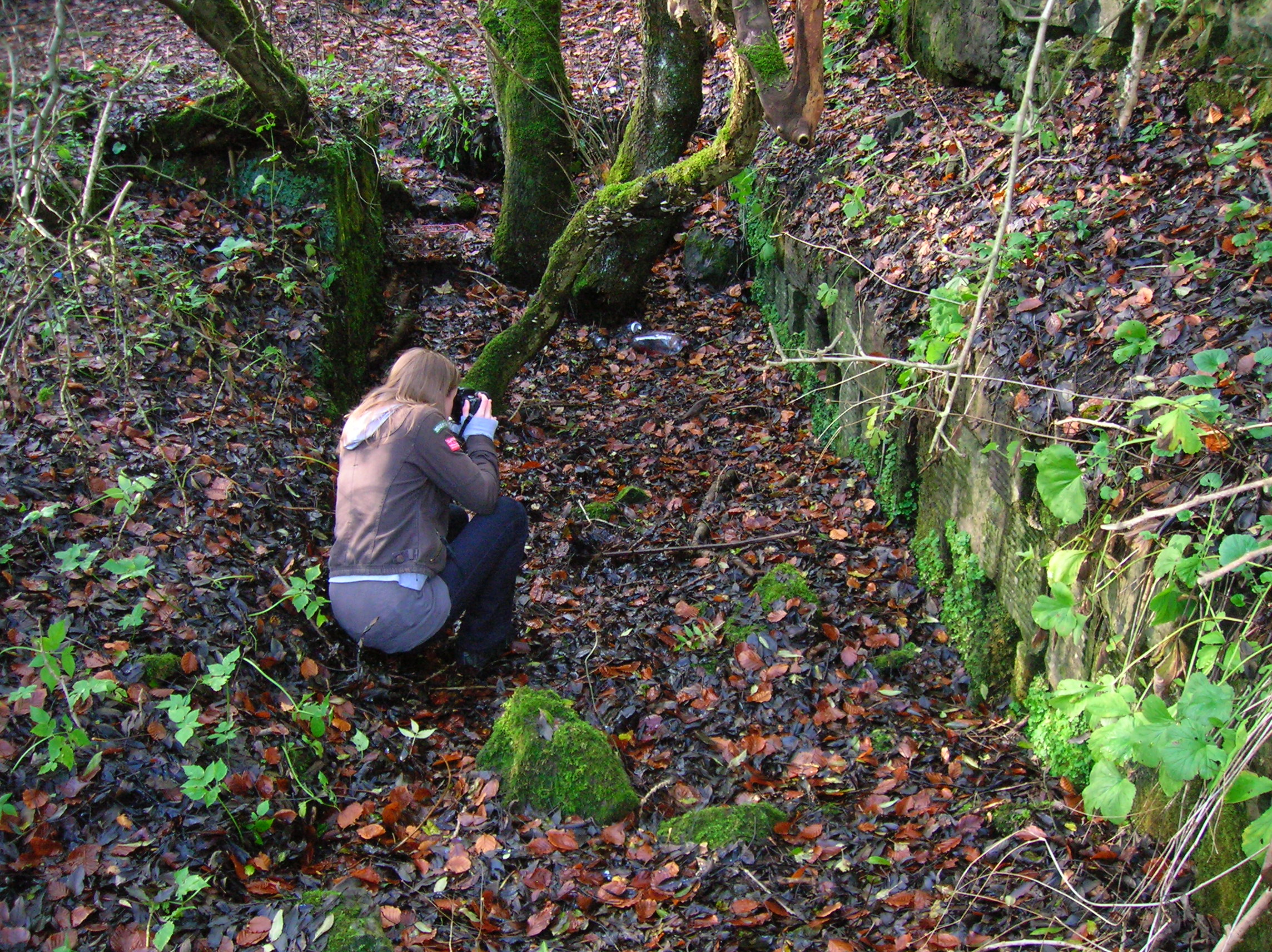
The water wheel pit of the old cotton mill

Alexander, 10th Earl, developed the old 'toun' of Eaglesham into a planned village. It was Archibald, 11th Earl of Eglinton, who largely saw Alexander's plans through to completion due to Alexander's early demise. The new village with two ranges of houses built around the Orry or village green, an area of common land about one-third of a mile long, divided up by the Linn or Kirkton Burn. 999 year leases were offered on condition that a house was built within five years, otherwise a fine of five pounds was imposed.

The Earl gave permission for tenants to quarry stone, were given sand and were allowed to use the Linn Burn for washing and the green for bleaching. With these encouragements weaving became the main industry until a cotton mill was built on the Orry in 1791. The New Statistical Account records the presence of 63 silk-looms at work in Eaglesham in 1790; this soon reduced to 33; and was quickly replaced by the weaving of cotton goods in association with Glasgow and Paisley manufacturers.

== Selina's tree ==
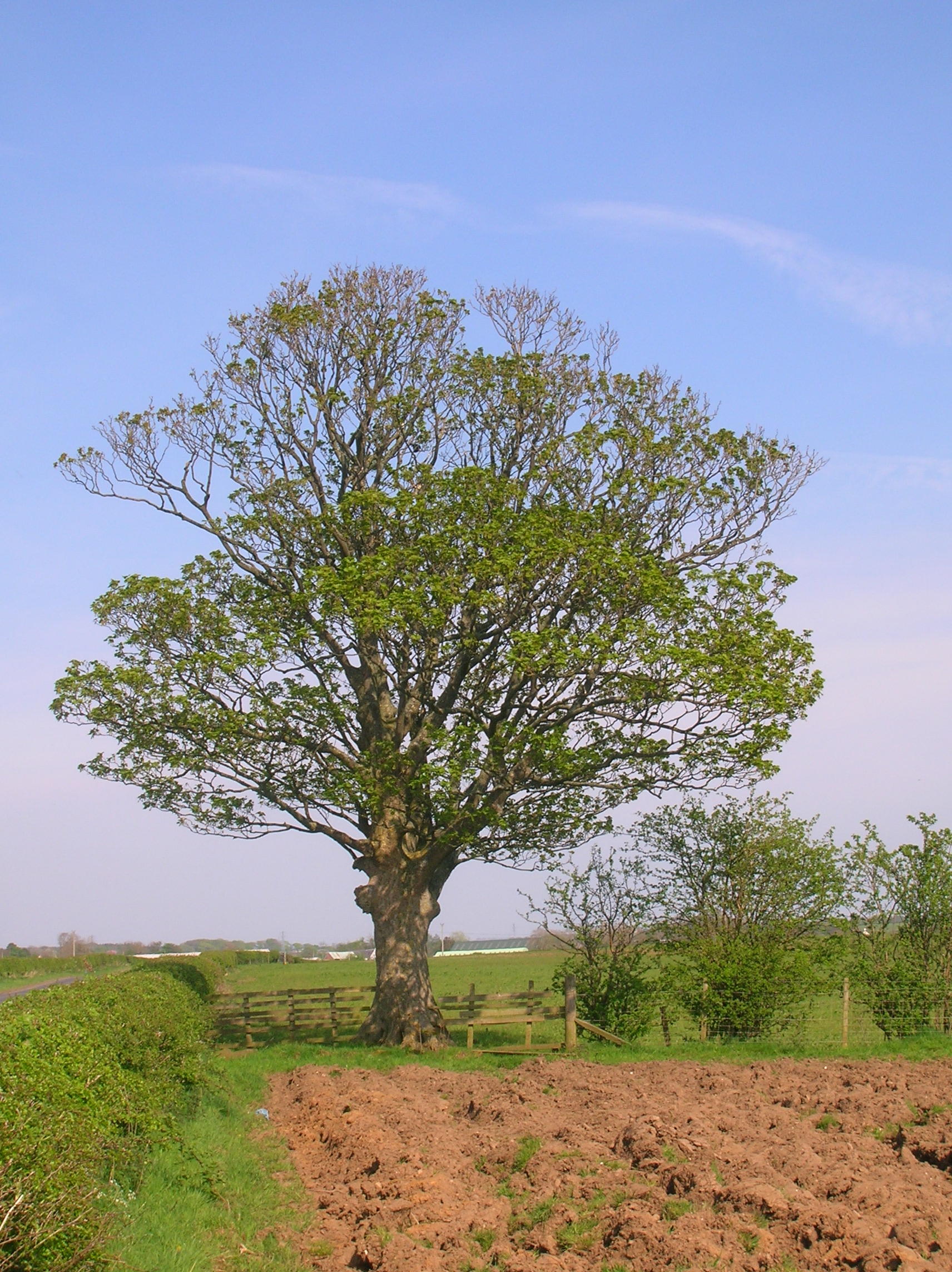
Selina's tree, a Sycamore or Scot's Plane, off Fergushill Road

Selina Higgins was born in Port Glasgow, with parents from Burslem in England, and she lived in the Five Roads area, married to a Mr. John Bannerman, a miner who worked at Ladyha Colliery. Selina had a severe stroke and it became a habit for her to walk to 'Selina's' tree, the furthest distance she could manage; they both died within a few months of each other in 1949 and left a large family, including a daughter, Helen (Nellie) Bannerman, who married Frank Gardner from Kingscavel, Linlithgow.

The tree in 2009 was still healthy and the name has become part of the local history of the area. It has also attracted 'speculative' legends suggesting lovers trysts, etc. In 2010 Selina's Tree (Latitude 55.654333 and Longitude -4.675326) was added to the Woodland Trust's 'Ancient and notable trees' website.
