= Benslie =

Village in southwest Scotland

Coordinates: 55°39′5.5″N 4°38′47.6″W

Benslie is a small village in North Ayrshire, in the parish of Kilwinning, Scotland. Map reference NS 336 429.

== History ==
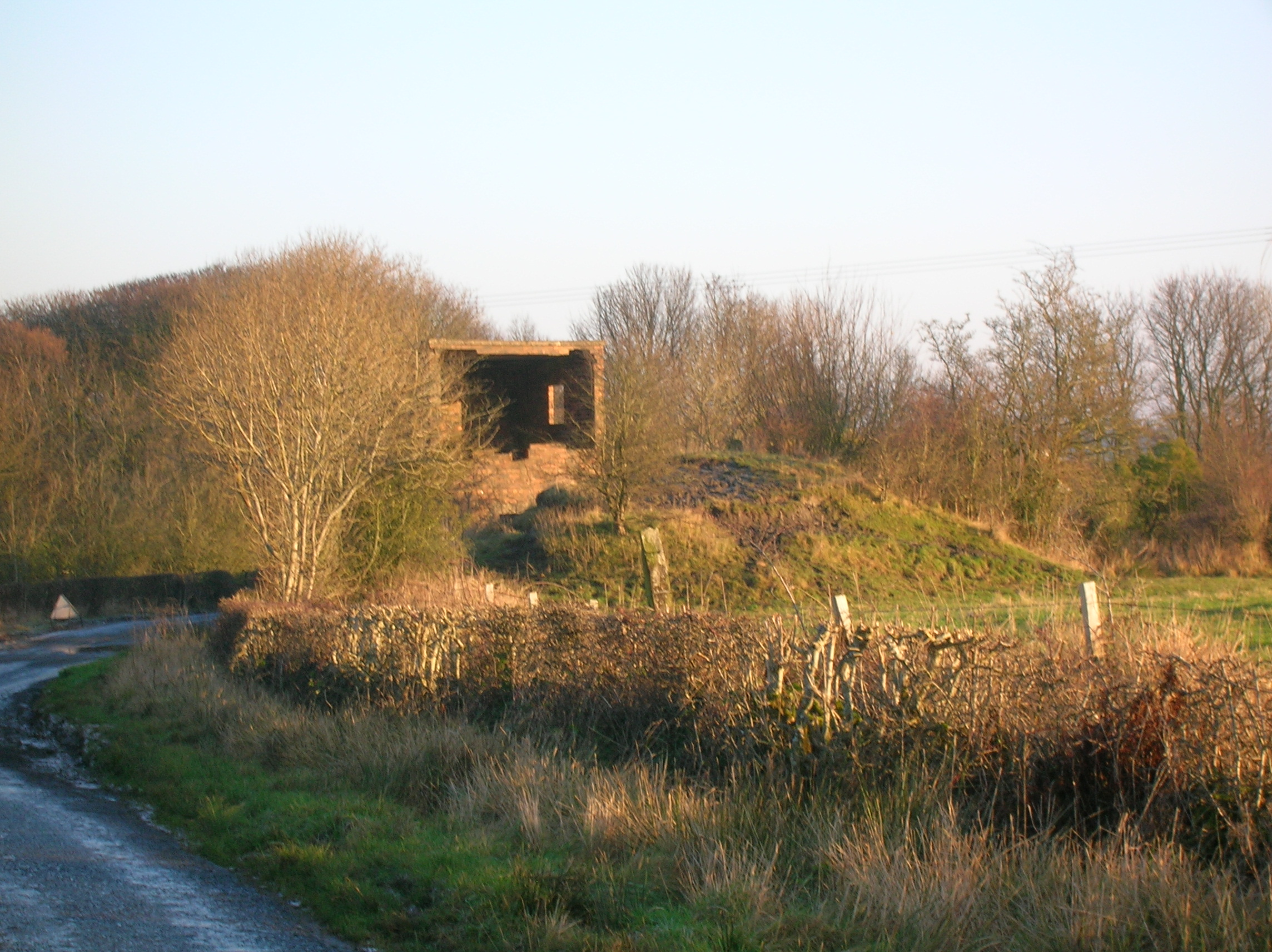
The ruins of the old coal mine near the old Montgreenan station bridge

This village, previously Benislay (1205), Beinslay (Timothy Pont 1604 - 08), Bainsley in 1821 (John Ainslie's map), Bensley (Groome 1903), Benslee or Benslee square on the 1860 OS map, Bendslee is situated next to Benslie wood. The village sits on the B 785 Fergushill Road and on the junction of the road to Montgreenan and Torranyard on the Lochlibo Road. The OS maps show that it was named 'Montgreenan' up until at least 1938, with the name Benslie given to the wood, the old farmhouse on the 'island' created by the three roads and the term Benslie Square. A Mission hall is marked as being at Benslie square on the 1910 OS map. The postal address may have been the direct cause of the name change, preventing confusion with the nearby Montgreenan estate.

Some dwellings were also present at Rosebank or Woodneuk (1858 OS map), situated just before the bridge that crossed the railway at Montgreenan station. A small mine was developed here and only a brick tower and bing remain in 2007. The village had a small Church hall which was used for indoor bowls and other activities. This building was demolished in 1993 and was replaced by a house named Kinnoull, a new family to the village moved into the house in 1994. A tennis court also existed at one time, next to the church hall. A number of new houses have been constructed since 1990; transforming the size and nature of this rural settlement.

Location of Benslie village, North Ayrshire, Scotland

A Chapel Hill cottage existed at one time, suggesting that the chapel existed on the 'hill', possibly within what is now Benslie Wood. A small mound existed in the wood near Wood Neuk Cottage, but this may have been removed during the building of the new houses. The 1774 Ayr Roads Act names a Corsehill Chapel on the Toll Road from Kilwinning to Dreghorn via Milnburn. A statement to the effect that a chapel existed in the middle of the 'feature;' has been made, however details are lacking. There is a Lady Acre on the lands of Corsehill.

The local farms include Benslie Fauld, as well as North and South Millburn. A lane connected Laigh Patterton Farm with the old Netherfield farm and Benslie. The exit is preserved between the two modern buildings, Benslie House and Kinnoull, near the old fireclay mine.

Robert Aitken's 1823 map of The Parishes of Ardrossan, Stevenston and Kilwinning shows a Backmossfauld farm near the old Netherfield farm. This map also gives East Doura as the name of the farm which was later known as South Millburn.

=== Benslie village views - 2007 / 08 ===
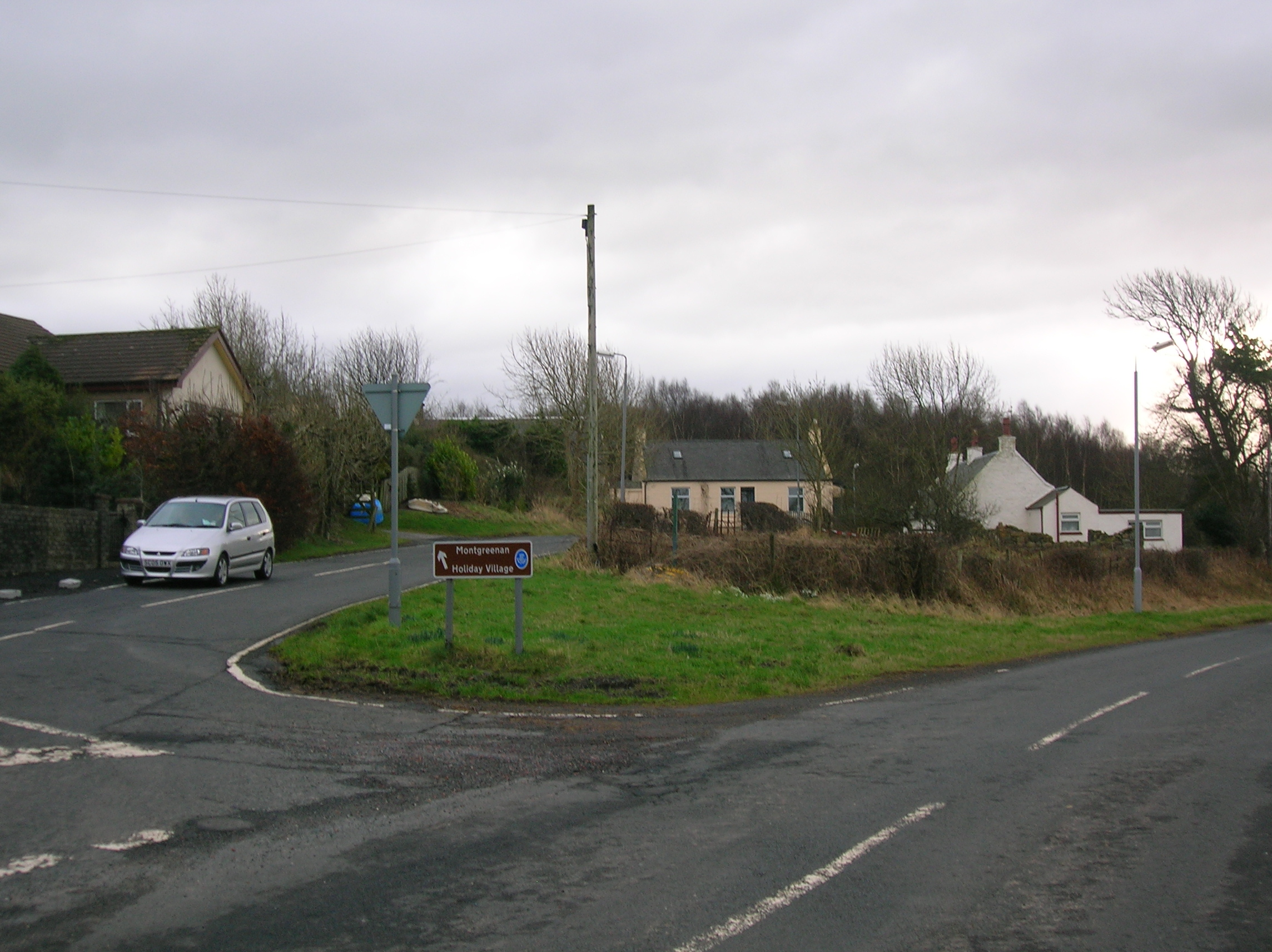
The village from the Fergushill side. Note Benslie Cottage and Roberton in the background.

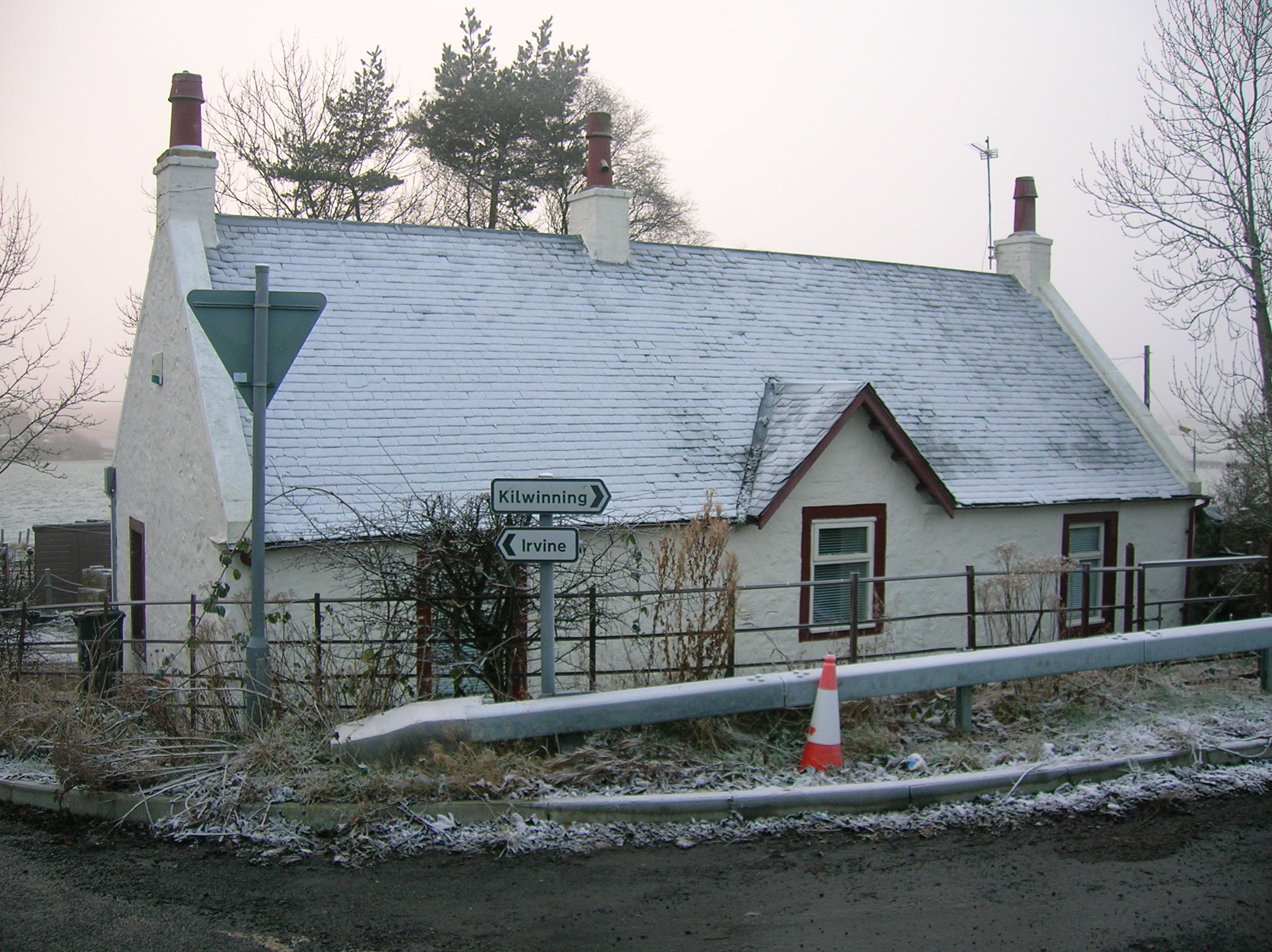
Benslie cottage, an old farm steading, from which the village took its 'modern' name

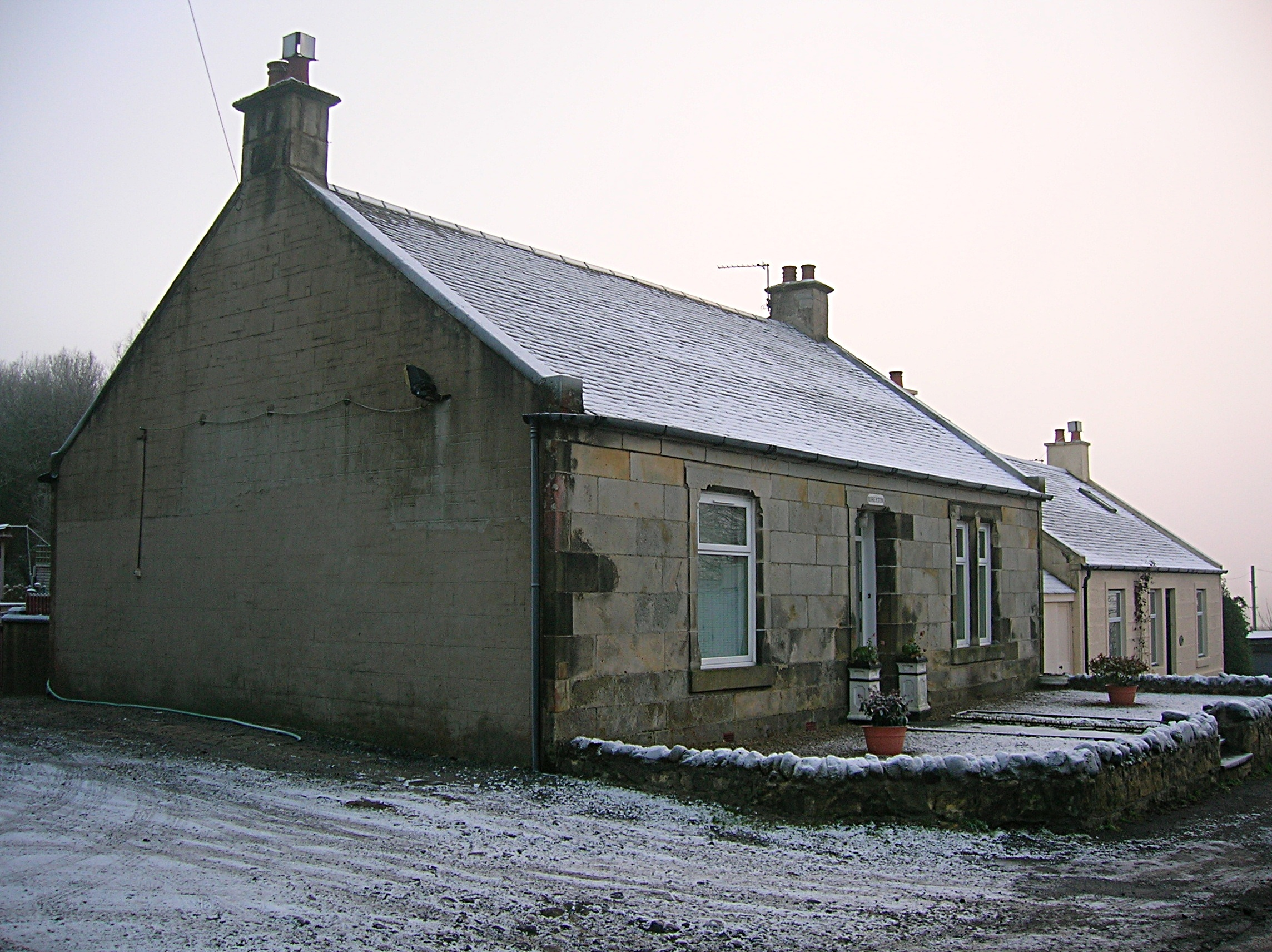
'Roberton' and another old Cottage, Woodside, which previously served as the village Post Office

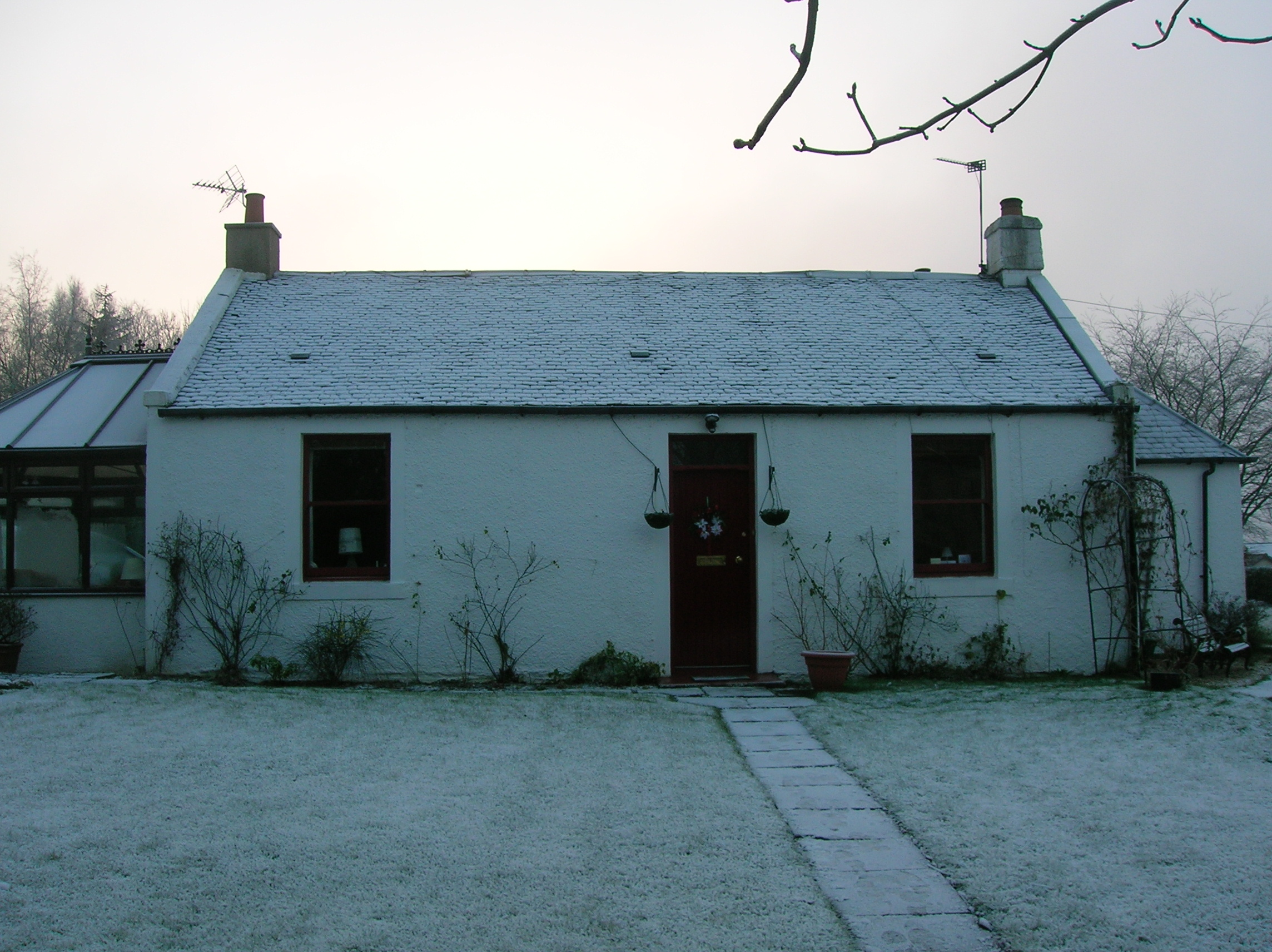
The old mine manager's house. A mound extends into this house's garden.
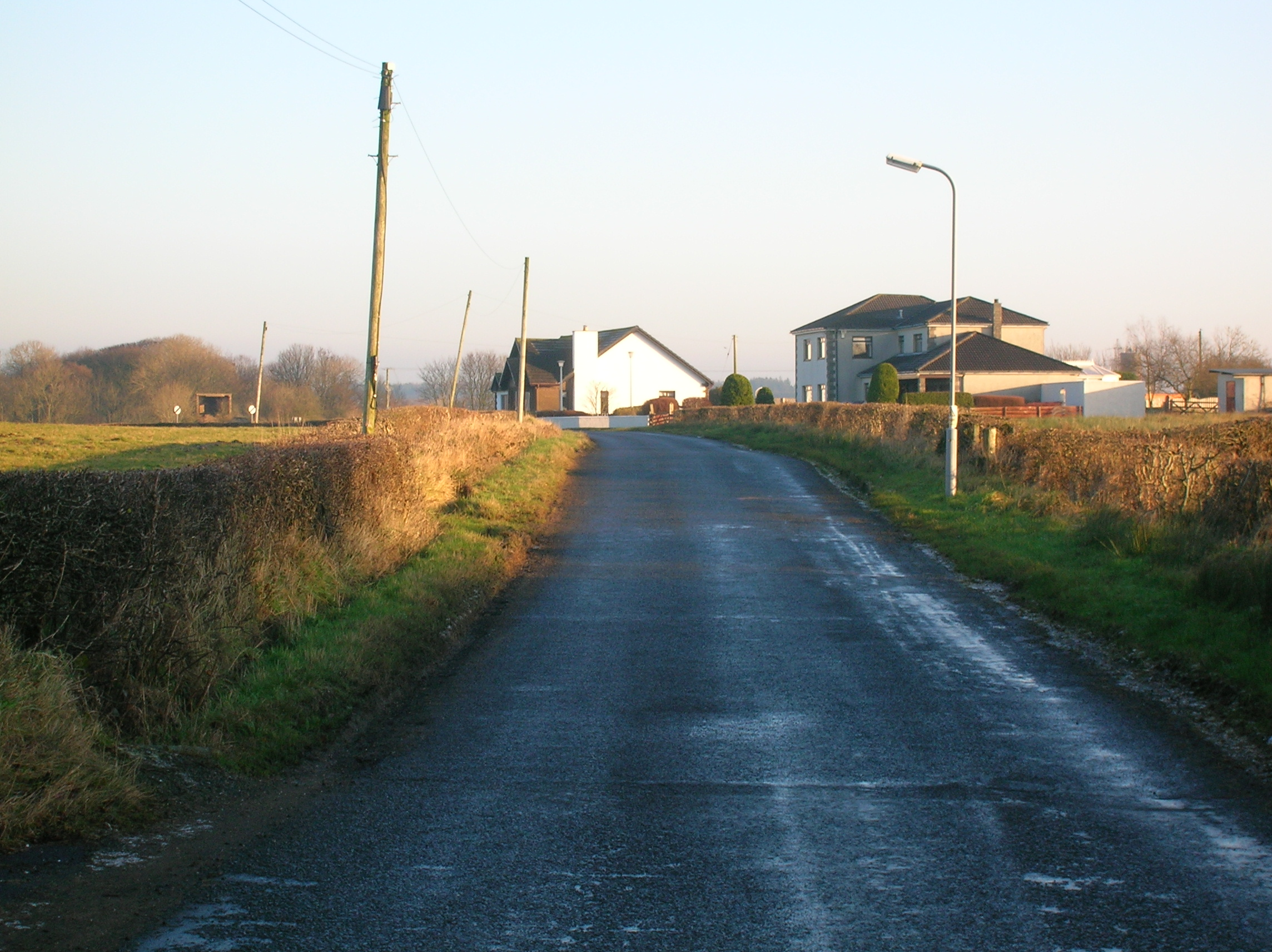
Looking towards Montgreenan with the new houses on the site of the old Community Hall and tennis court, with the old 'Rosebank' colliery ruins in the background

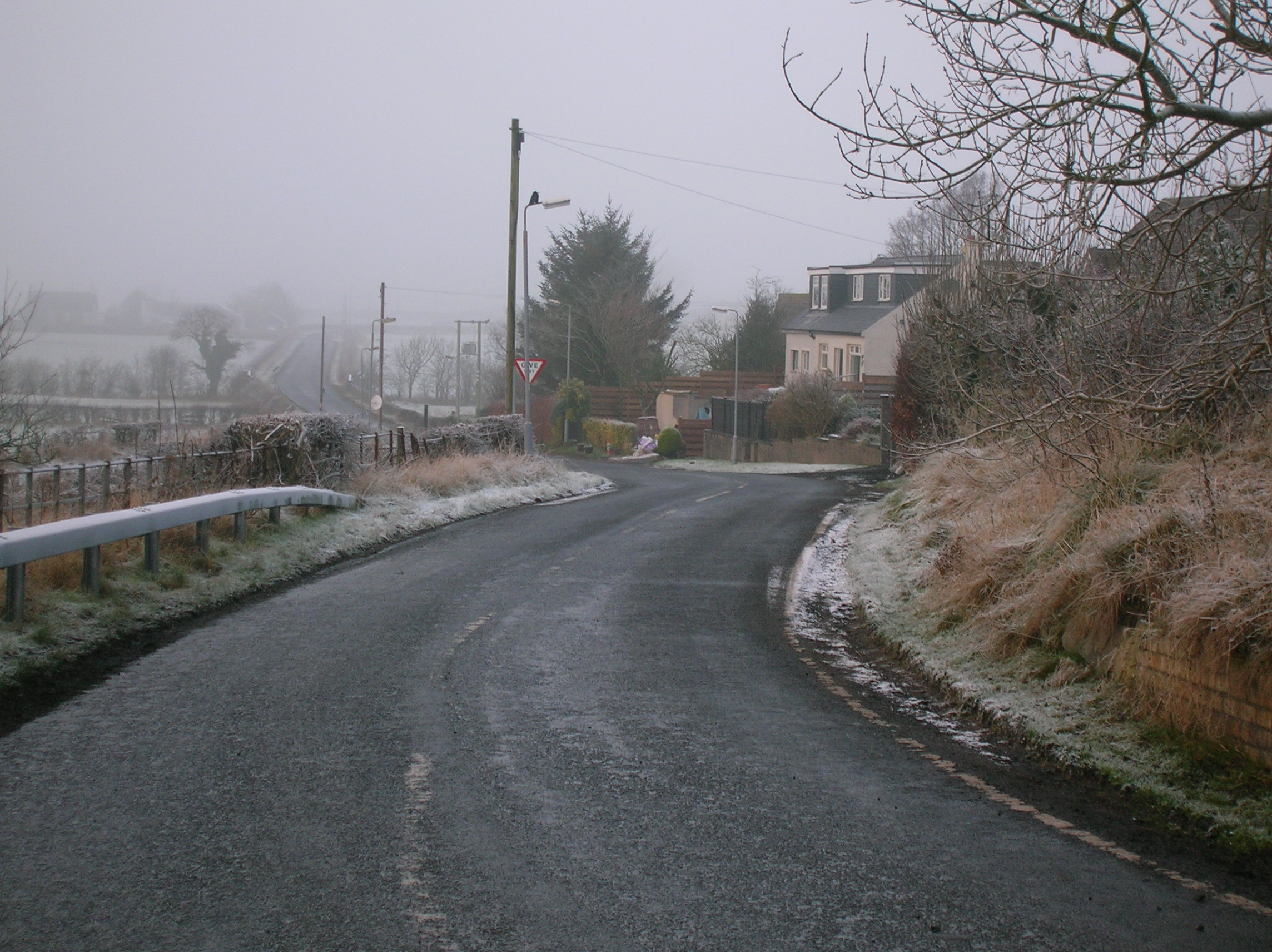
On a frosty day looking towards Fergushill from Benslie Cottage

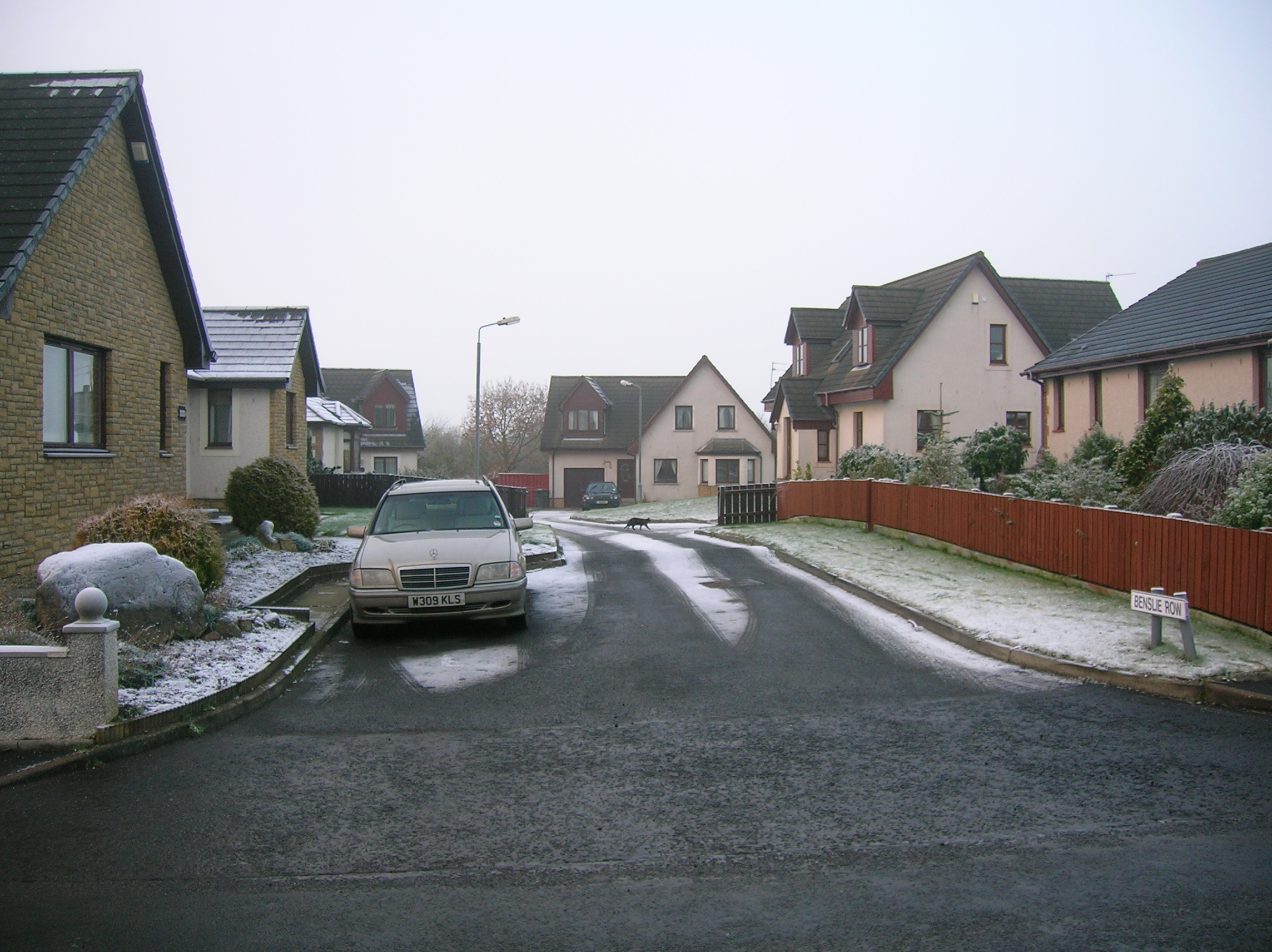
Benslie Row on the site of the old miner's rows

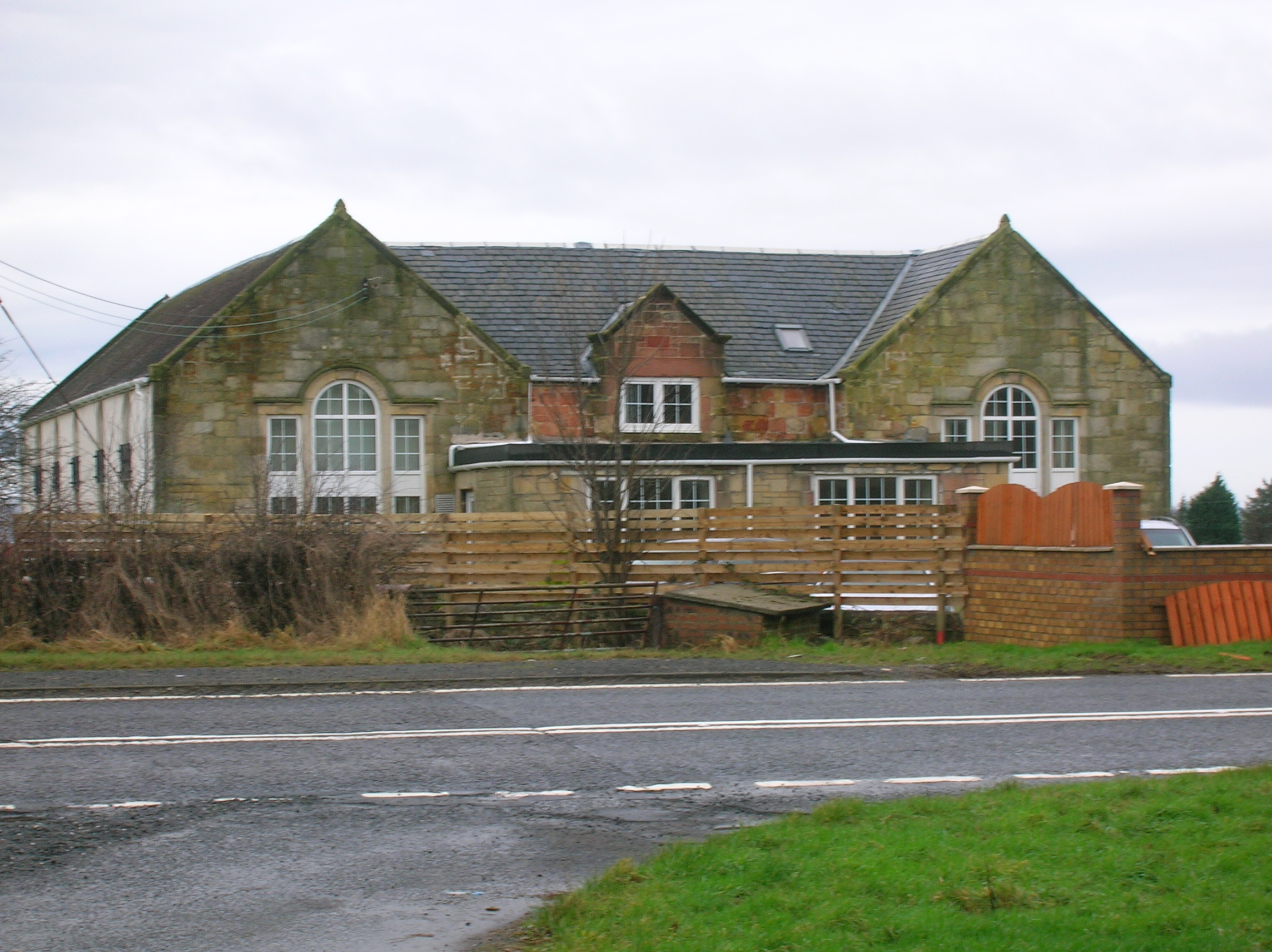
Annick Primary School, now a private house

== The Ardrossan Railway - Doura branch ==
This line began life as a waggonway which opened in 1831 between Ardrossan and Kilwinning and was known as the Ardrossan and Johnstone Railway. James Sword was the lines Superintendent. It was initially built to the Scotch gauge of 4 ft 6 in (1,372 mm) and was worked by horses. It had a passenger service from 28 July 1834 and was worked by carriages which held 24 passengers, 16 inside and 8 outside.

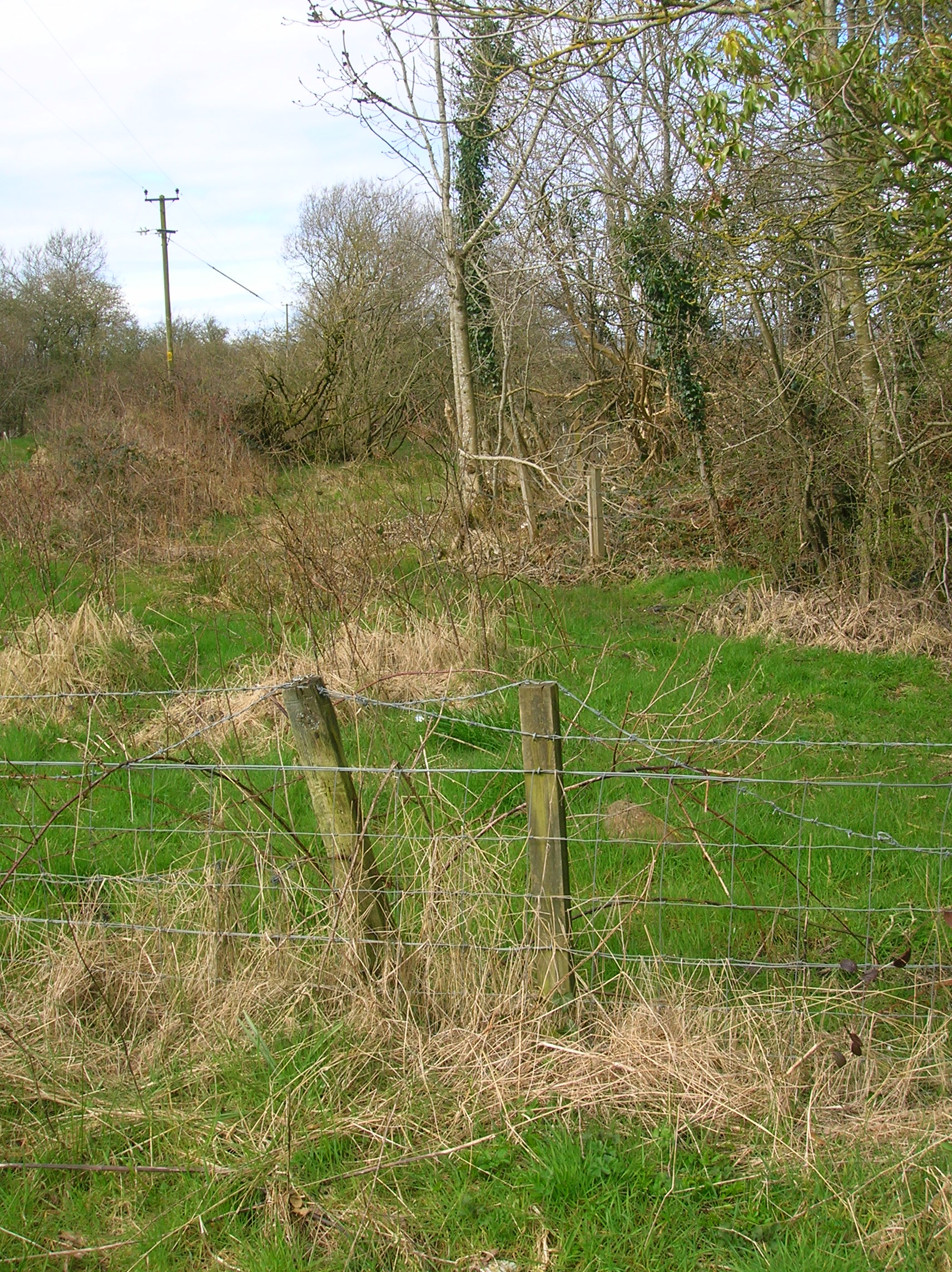
The course of the waggonway from Millburn drive looking towards Kilwinning

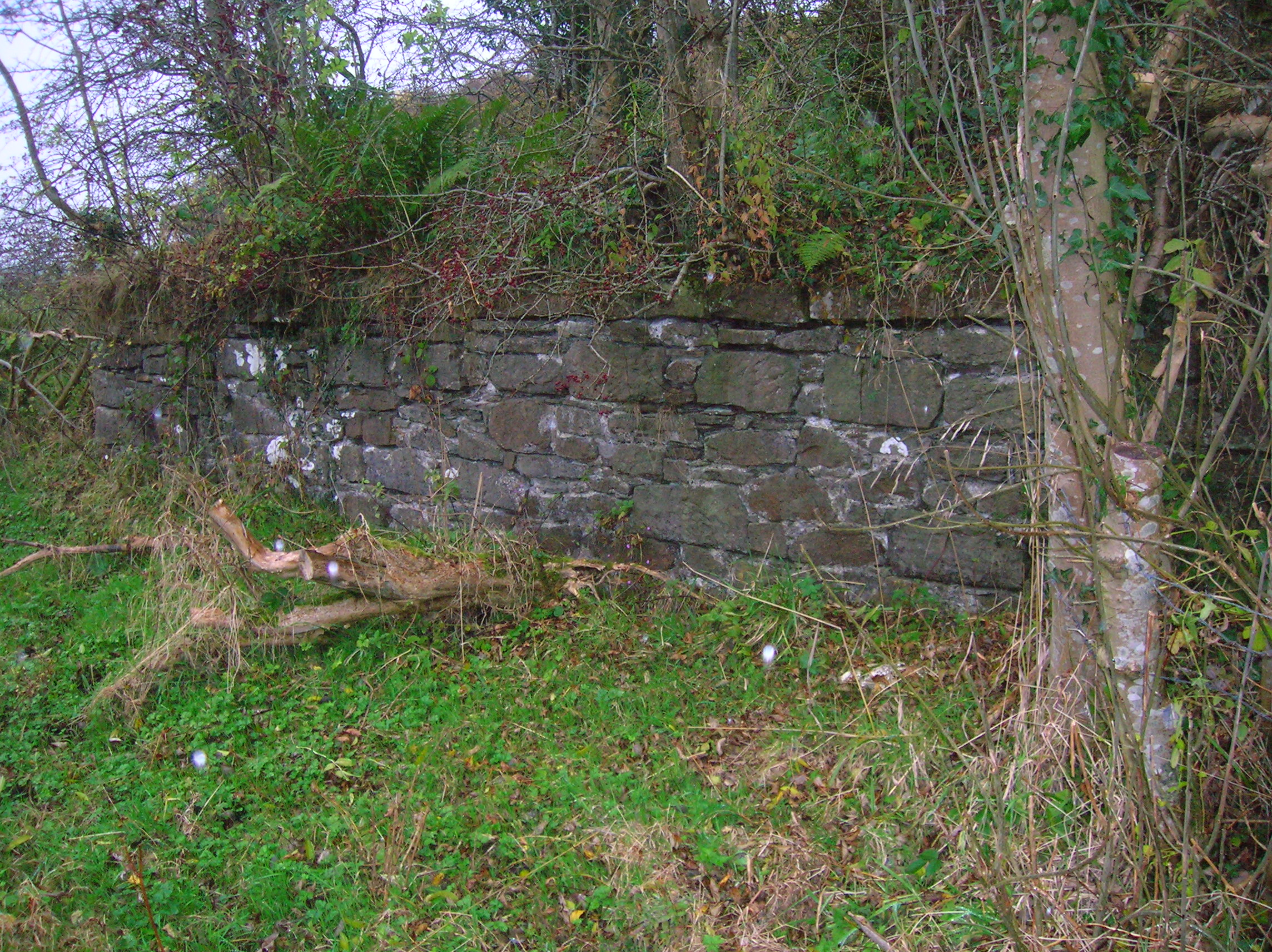
The loading dock or 'hurry' at the Benslie coup, on the closed & lifted Doura waggonway branch

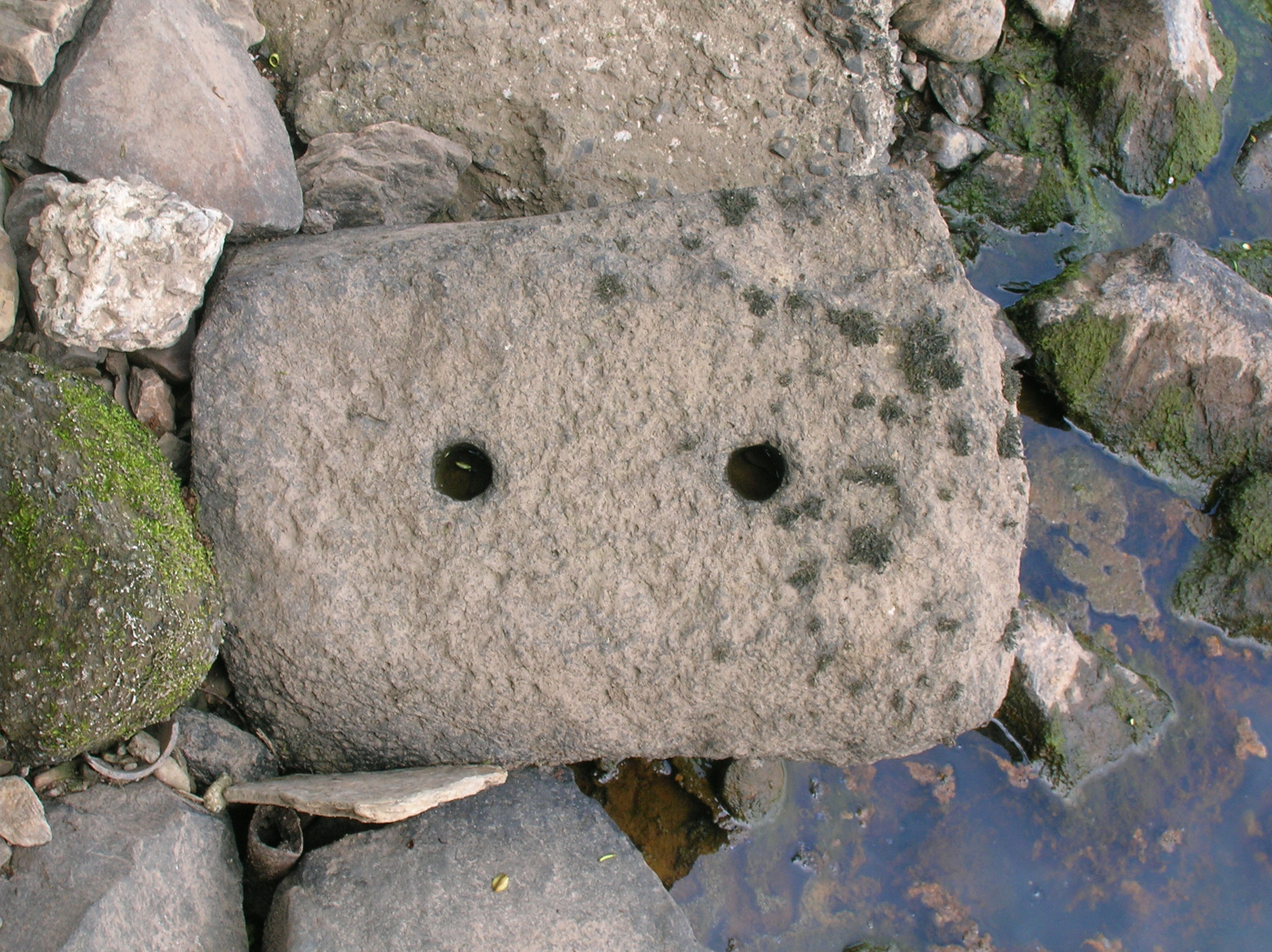
An original K & T R plateway sleeper. 54 cm long, 30 cm wide and 26 cm deep. The holes are 15 cm deep.

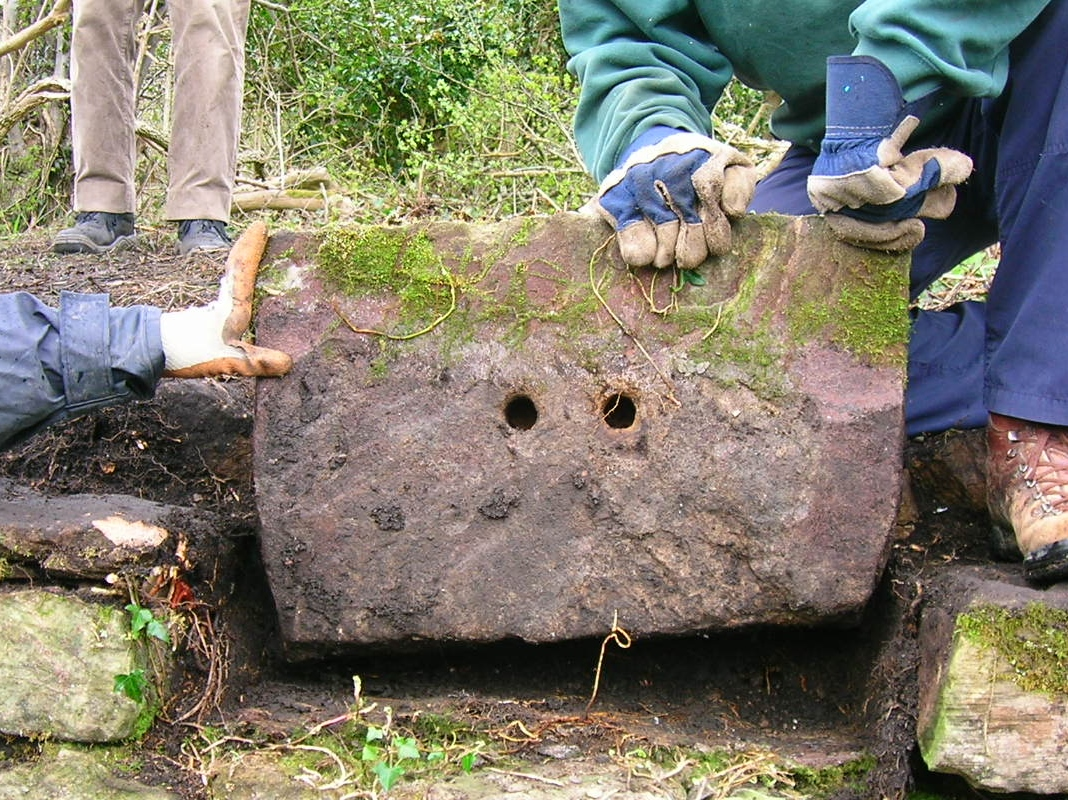
Stone railway sleeper found at the Hurry near Millburn Drive

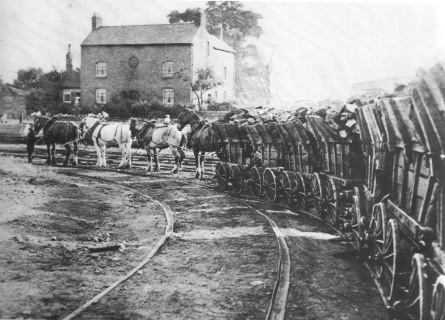
A typical wagonway. The Little Eaton Gangway.

The railway was built by the Glasgow, Paisley and Ardrossan Canal company as the Ardrossan and Johnstone Railway. It commenced on the west side of Ardrossan harbour. The three-mile-long (five-kilometre) Doura branch waggonway was opened in 1834, and left the main line near Stevenston. It turned east (crossing under the later Glasgow, Paisley, Kilmarnock and Ayr Railway) and connected various industrial workings on the Eglinton Castle estate on its way to reach the Doura coal pit. The 1/2-mile (800-metre) Fergus Hill branch left the Doura branch just after the Lugton Water crossing to reach the Fergus Hill coal pit.

In 1833 [sic] Sir James Cunningham extended the Doura branch to his extensive coal and fireclay workings at Perceton. Up until the 1850s this line was worked using horse haulage. Each wagon carried about one ton of coal. The Doura branch was private until 1839 when the Ardrossan Railway Company came into being.

The re-laying of track with a heavier rail and the gauge conversion from 4 ft 6 in (1,370 mm) to 4 ft 8 1/2 in (1,435 mm) was all carried out in a period of one week in spring 1840. The landowners had paid for the extension and the line had its gradients and curves altered to allow for locomotive working.

One record gives October 1, 1846 for the opening of the Standard Gauge Doura to Perceton section of the line and another July 1, 1848.

In spring 1840 the line had been regauged to standard gauge and thus it could be connected with the Glasgow, Paisley, Kilmarnock and Ayr Railway; in 1854 both lines merged with the new Glasgow and South Western Railway.

=== 1830s railway track ===
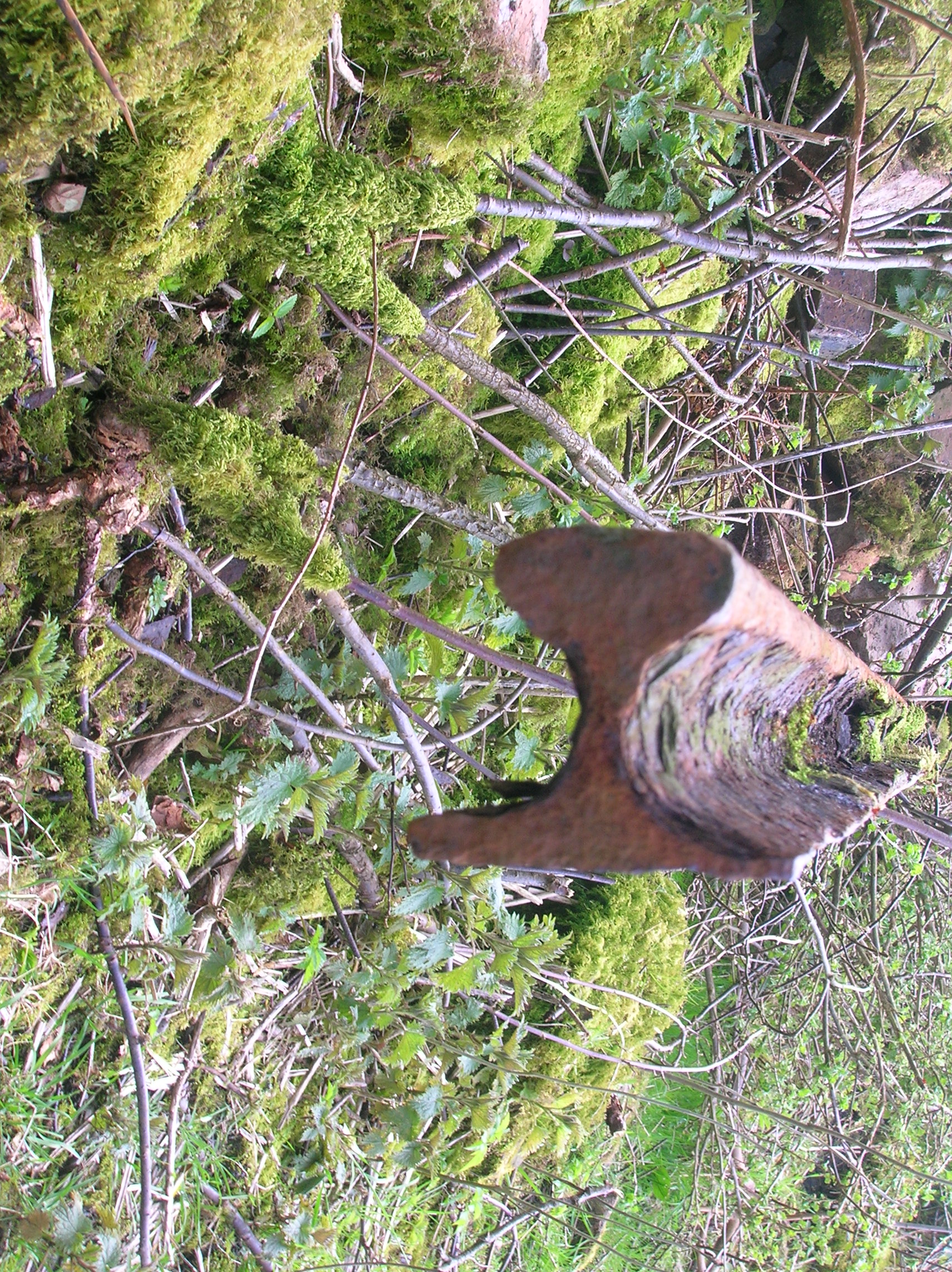
A flat bottomed and 15-foot-long (4.6-metre) section of Vignole rail from the 1834 Ardrossan and Johnstone Railway

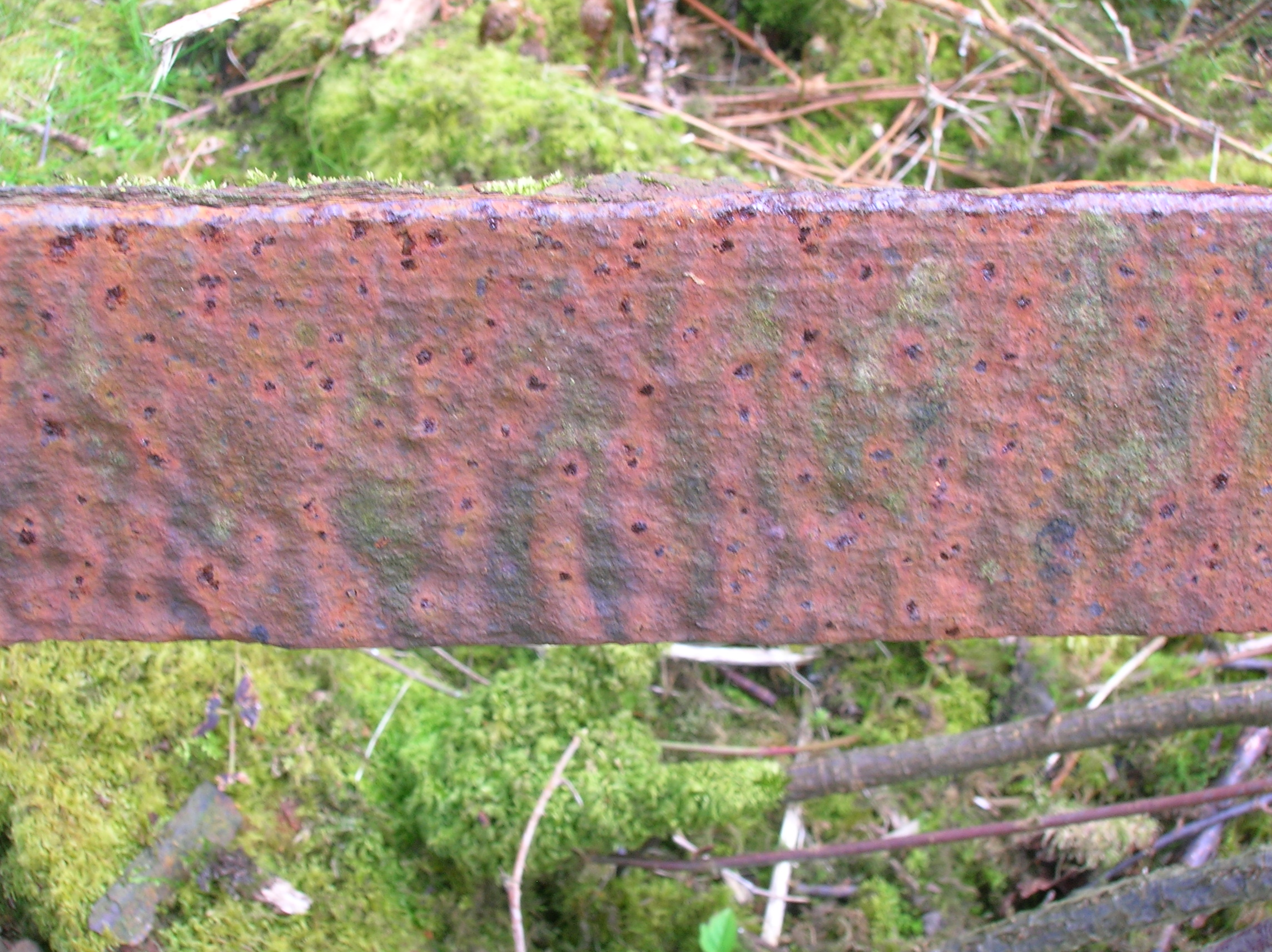
The underside of an old Vignole rail at Millburn 'station'

A section of the light weight 1831 waggonway track survived at Millburn near Benslie and was recovered in 2009 for restoration and study.

This Vignole type section track has a large surface of contact with the sleeper and is therefore a flat-bottomed rail rather than double-headed, bull-headed, etc. It is 15 ft (4.6 m) long, typical of early rail lengths and has no holes for fishplates as these were not invented until after 1839; special joint-chairs were used at that time to hold the ends in place. The fishplate, originally without bolt holes, was invented by William Bridges Adams in May 1842 and used from 1849.

Several holed sandstone blocks have been found built into the 'Hurry' at and it is likely that the wrought iron rails were spiked to these large stone sleepers. Granite railway sleepers shipped in via Ardrossan from Ailsa Craig are also said to have been used. The rail height is somewhat less than a typical modern rail as it was not designed to carry the weight of a locomotive. The rails are 2 1/2 in (64 mm) high, 2 3/4 in (70 mm) wide at the bottom (the foot), and 1 1/2 in (38 mm) wide at the top (the head). The central web is therefore much shorter than conventional rails. When the Ardrossan and Johnstone Railway was converted to standard gauge c. 1840, heavier rails were used, the lighter version probably being the type recovered from Millburn.

=== South Millburn Cottage ===
Opposite the old South Millburn farm is a ruined cottage with unusual architectural features. The gable ends both held rectangular windows with an unusually elongated vertical axis, not set centrally, but offset towards the back of the building which itself faces South Millburn. These slit windows would have given a clear view to anyone within the building of any activity to the sides of the building. The side facing South Millburn had one similar windows to the gable inserts as shown by a surviving lintel. The side facing the Eglinton estate had two doors and one splayed and one lit window with finely worked recycled stone that may have come from Kilwinning Abbey. Both gable ends of the building had fireplaces and a door in each.

The building was built to serve the South Millburn pit as it was first known as South Millburn Pit House. After the pit closed it was used as a cottage or cottages in the late 19th and through the mid-20th century and was later converted for use as a pig sty before being used in some way when the site was used as a parking and maintenance area for coaches.

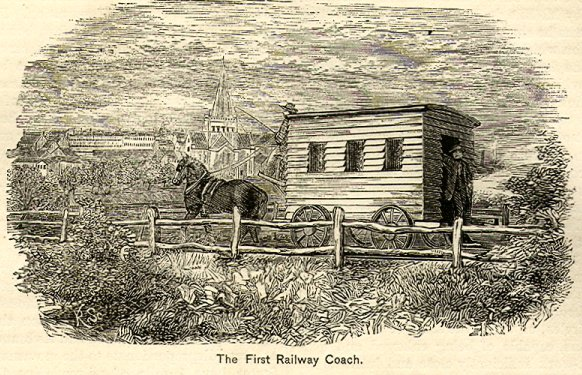
Early horse drawn railway and coach

The old Ordnance Survey maps indicate that this building sat just behind and parallel to the horse drawn waggonway trackbed, opened in 1831 to Byres at Kilwinning and ran up to Doura by 1834, ending at the coal pits. Later the building had the Perceton / Sourlie freight Branch of the Glasgow and South Western Railway located in front of it. A door was set into the gable's end. The fireplaces were set in the gable ends, despite the odd position of the windows.

This building stood close by to a railway crossing keeper's hut at the level crossing that controlled rail traffic crossing the Eglinton Castle estate's Millburn Drive and the nearby road. Millburn drive was also part of the old 1774 road from Kilwinning to Irvine, running across the Red Burn at the Drukken Steps and passed in front of the Draughtburn Gates and lodges.

The method of construction and architecture of the 'build' shows that it was constructed under the influence the Earl of Eglinton, possibly using re-cycled stone (See gallery); as were many of the Eglinton estate structures, the stone coming from the old Kilwinning Abbey ruins and possibly other sources. Well made recycled stone is mixed with poorly worked stone or rubble and bricks were used in the chimney flues.

In 2013 Kilwinning Heritage carried out an industrial archaeology rescue investigation at the cottage, assisted by Rathmell Archaeology, resulting in excavations, measurements and local history research to record and clarify issues relating to the building's construction, uses and occupancy.

The Robson family were the last occupants and the main building ended its life as a pigsty.

=== Details of the South Millburn Cottage - 2007 ===
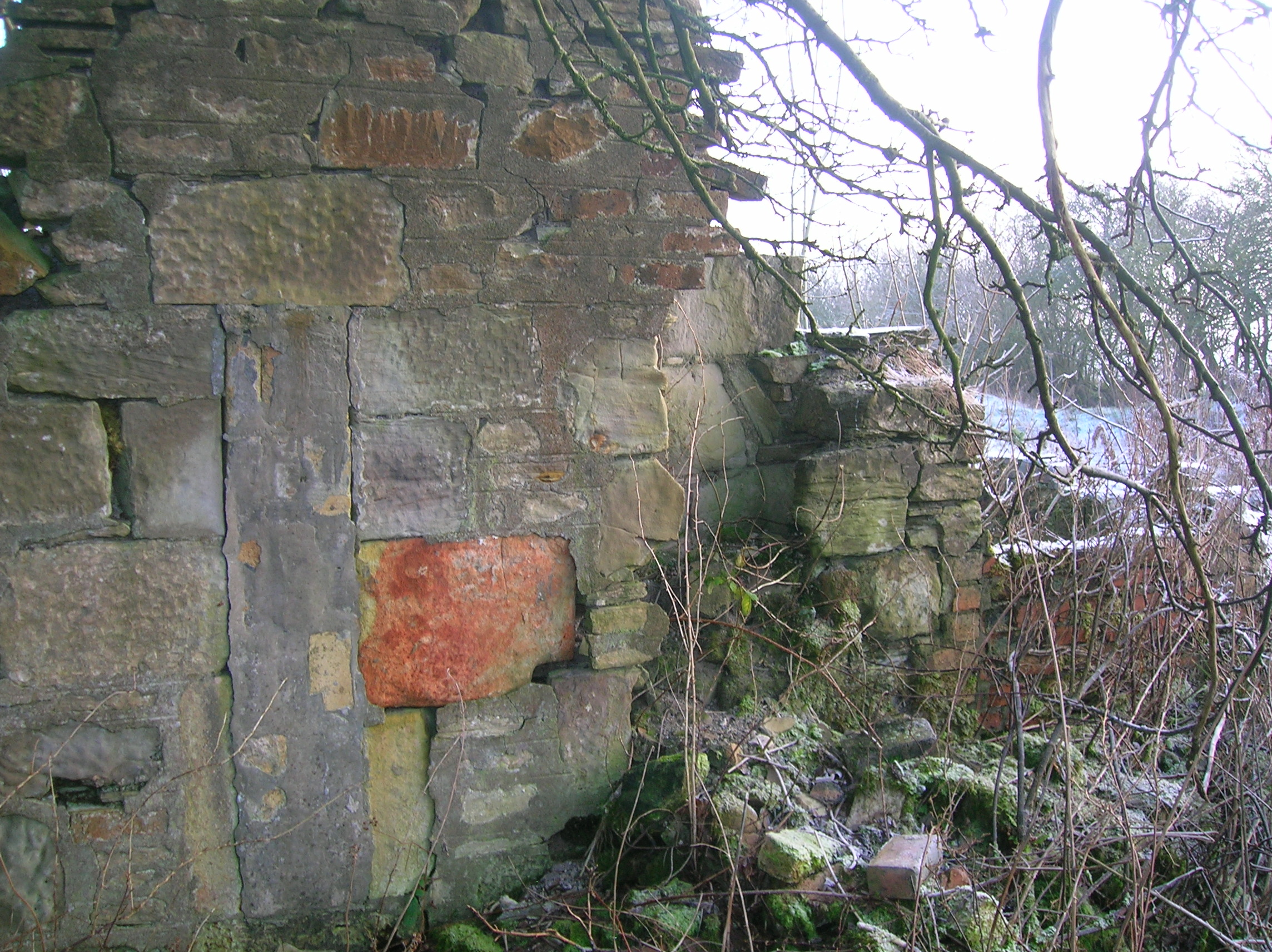
The gable end. Note the very unusual elongated window set towards the side of the house and the old bricked up doorway.

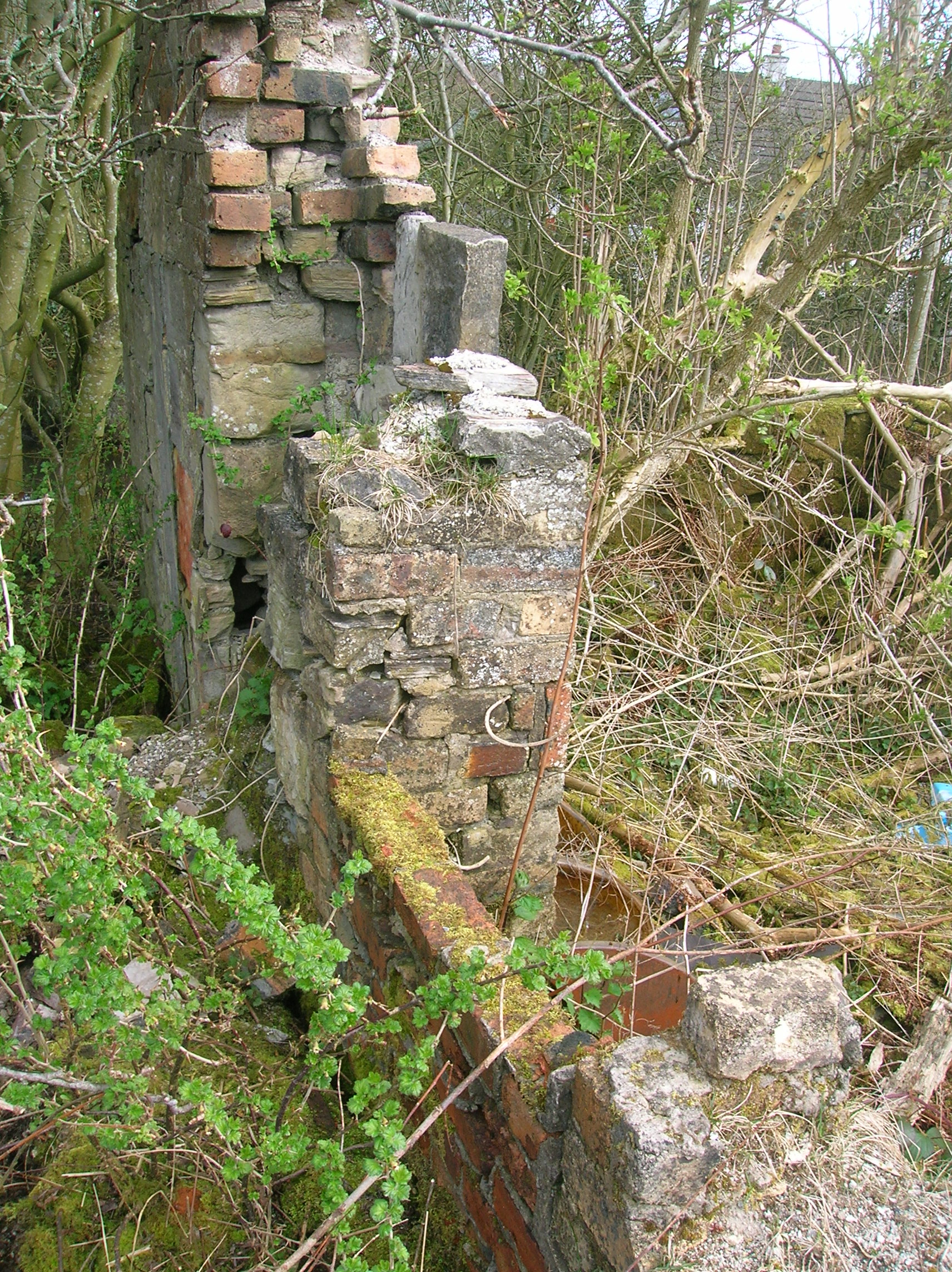
Details of the blocked up door and chimney flue

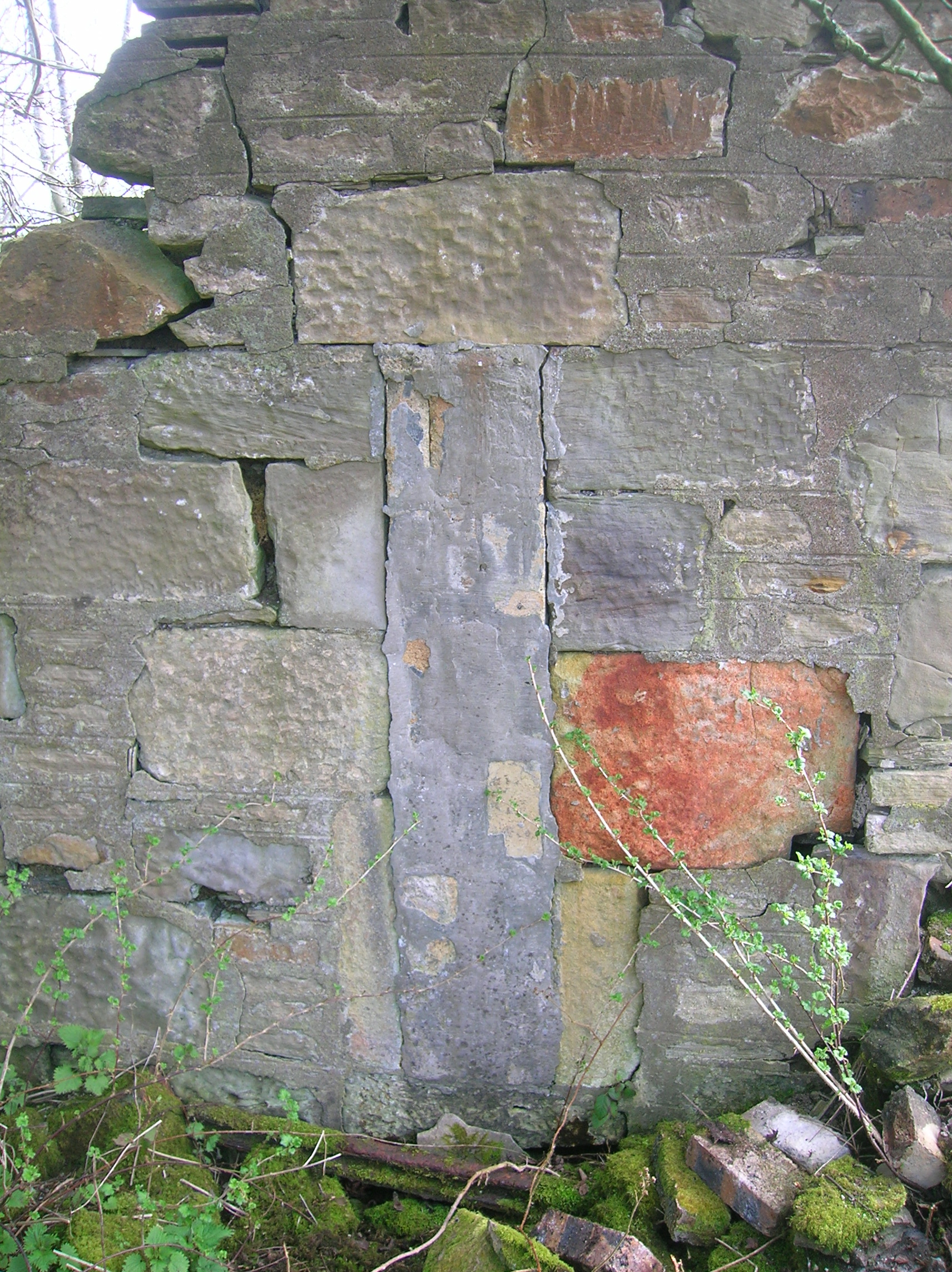
Gable end detail, facing towards Benslie

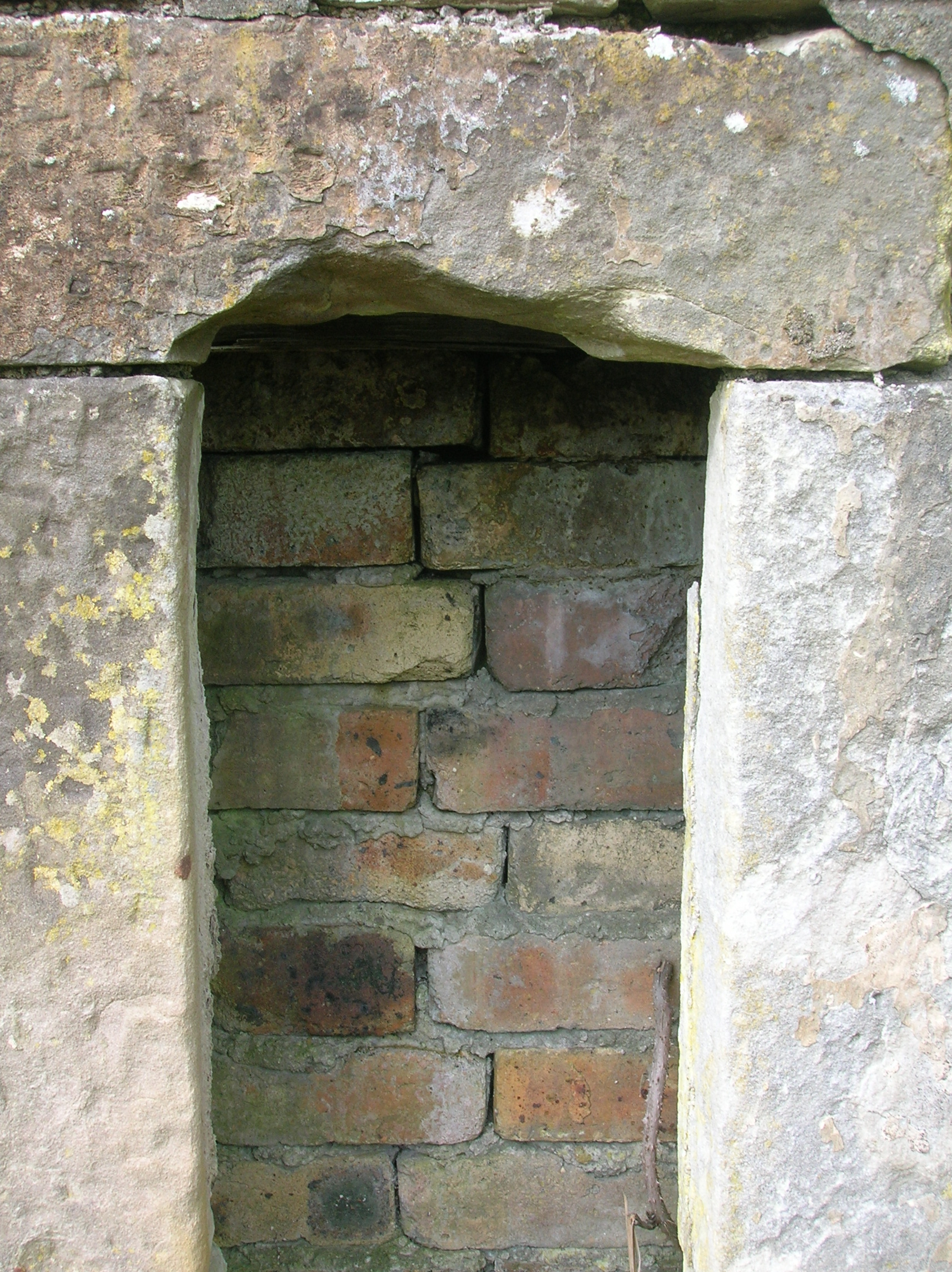
Elongated window on the Auchenwinsey facing gable end
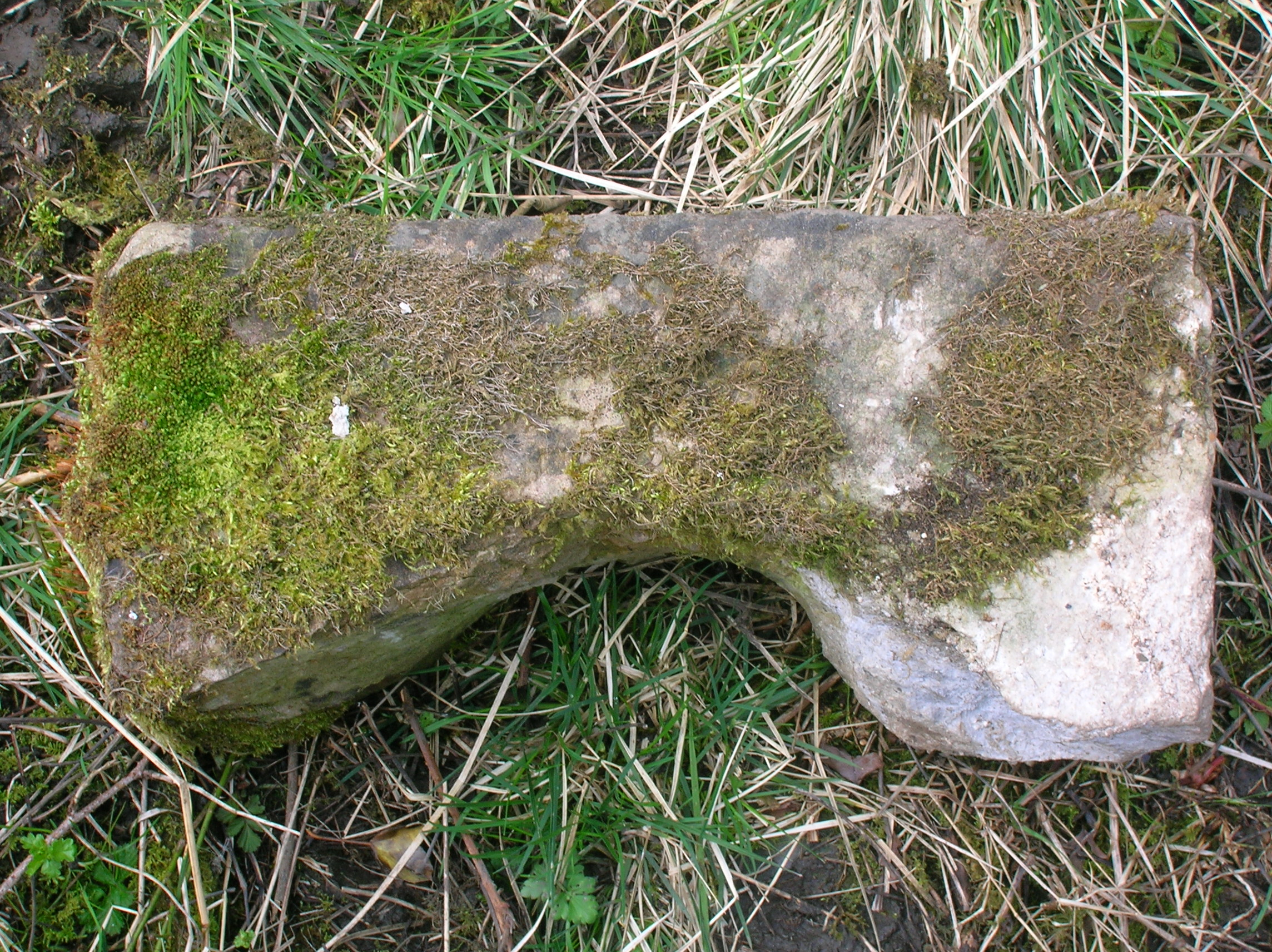
Window lintel from the South Millburn facing wall

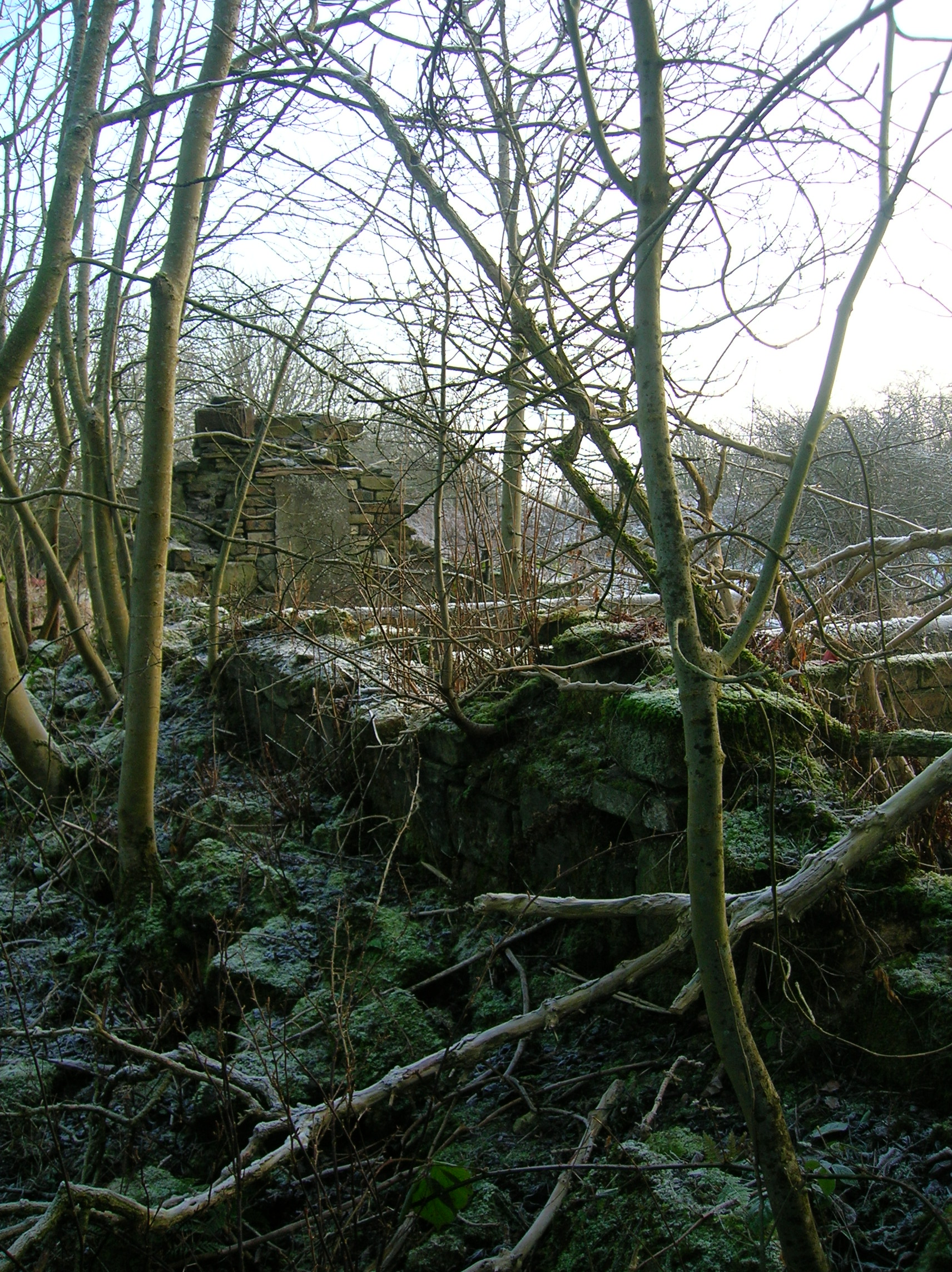
The side of the building facing Benslie Wood

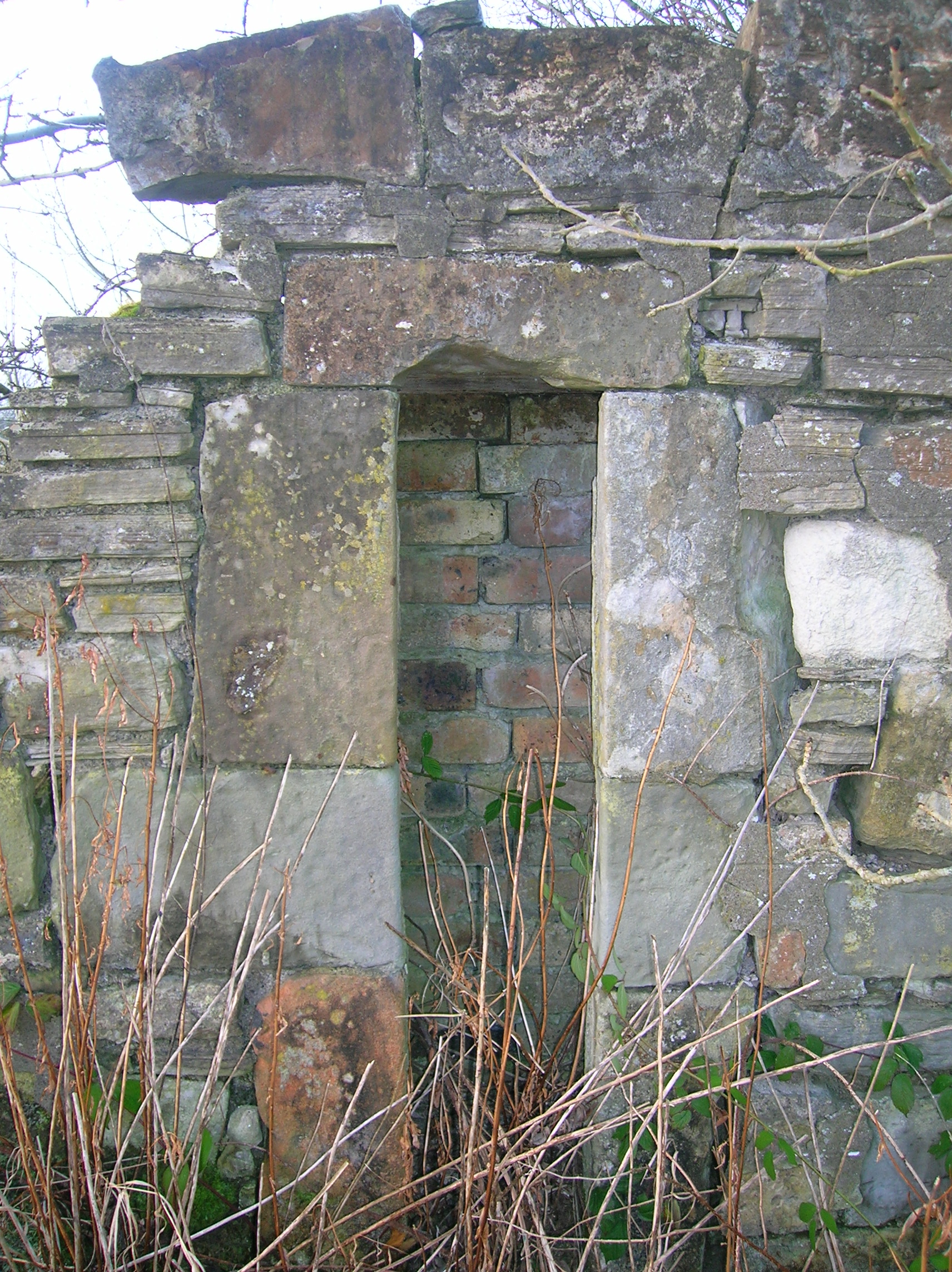
The highly unusual elongated window in the 'Auchenwinsey' facing end

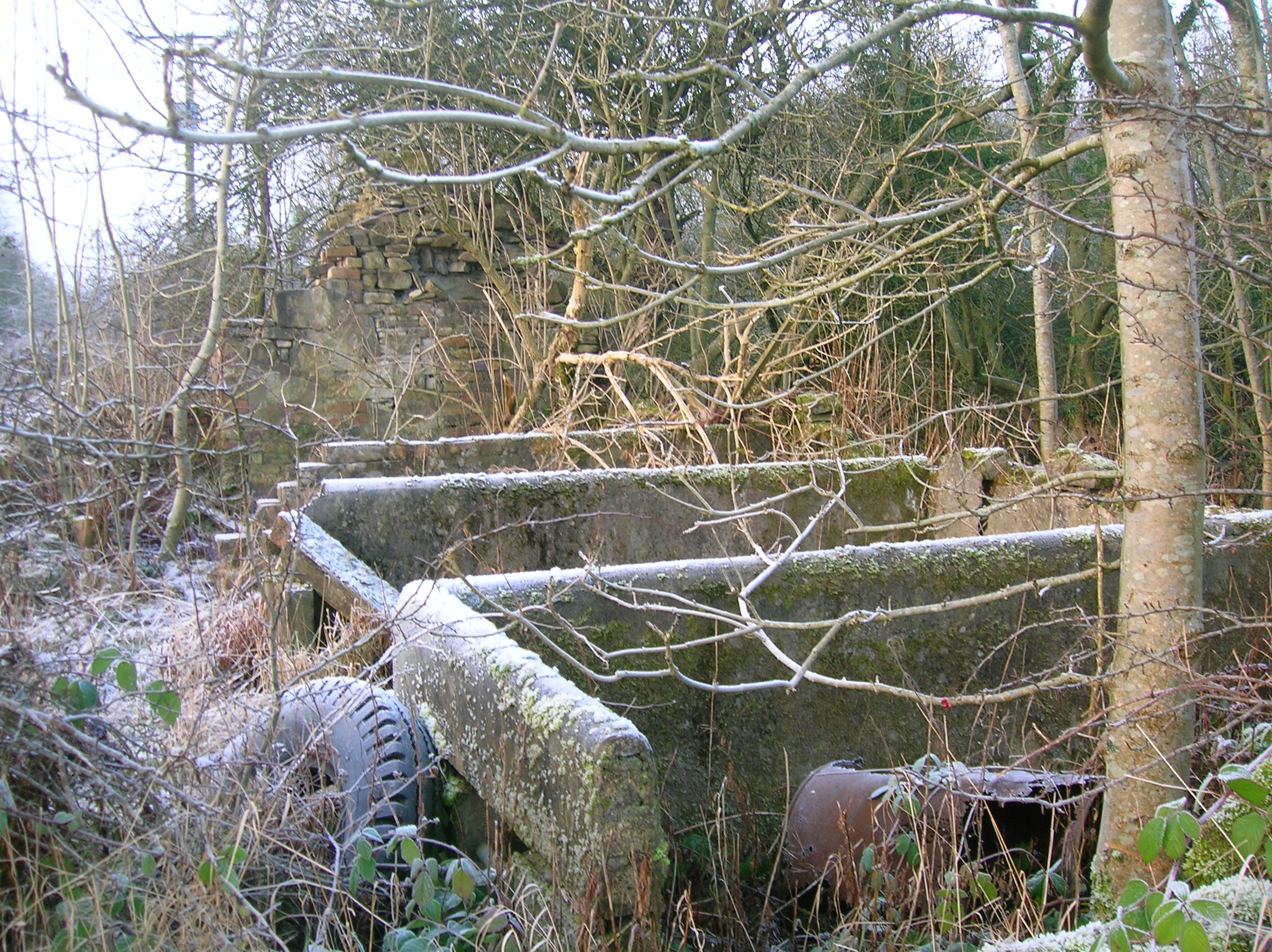
The pig pens within the old 'cottage'
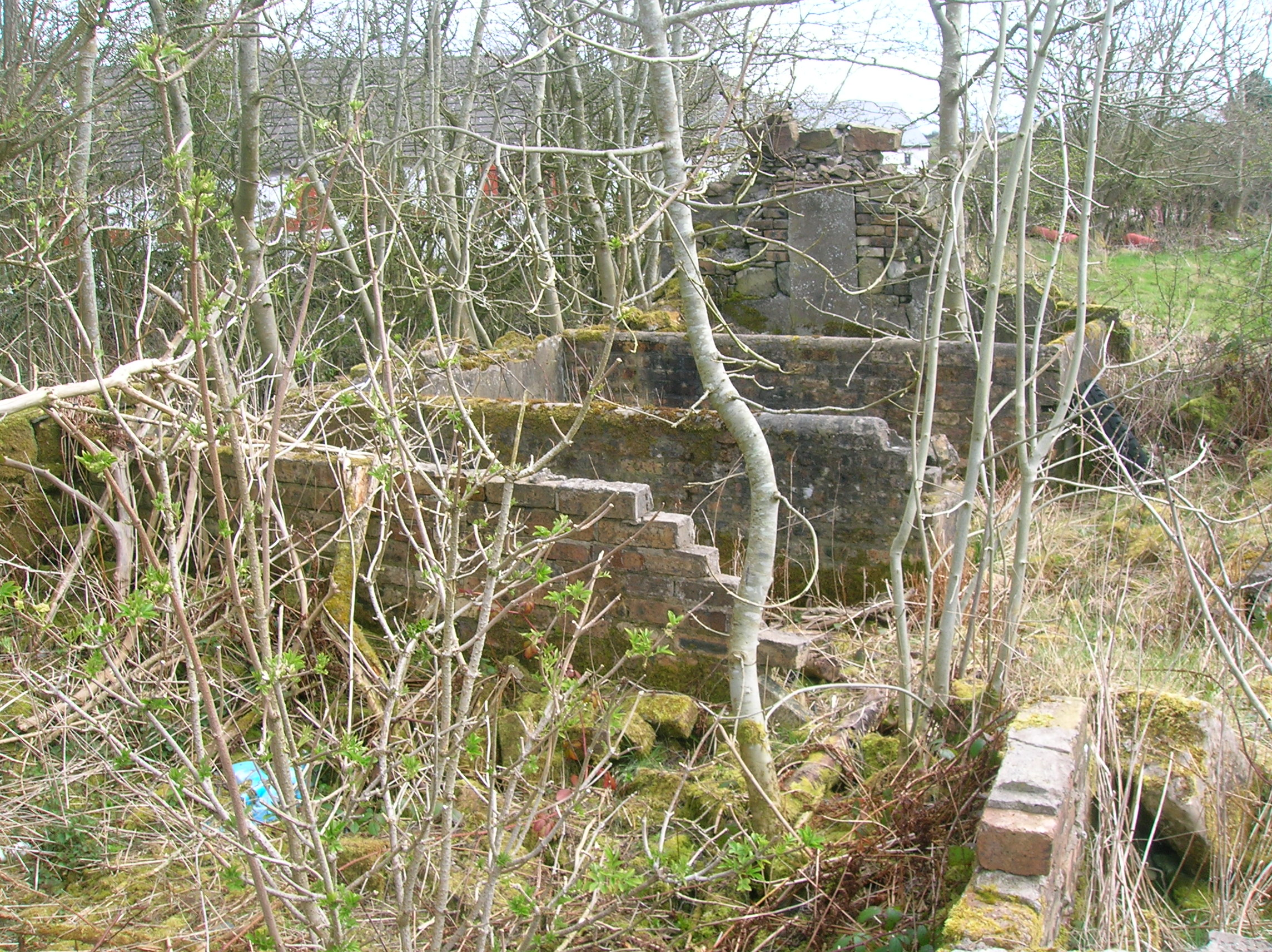
Pig pens view

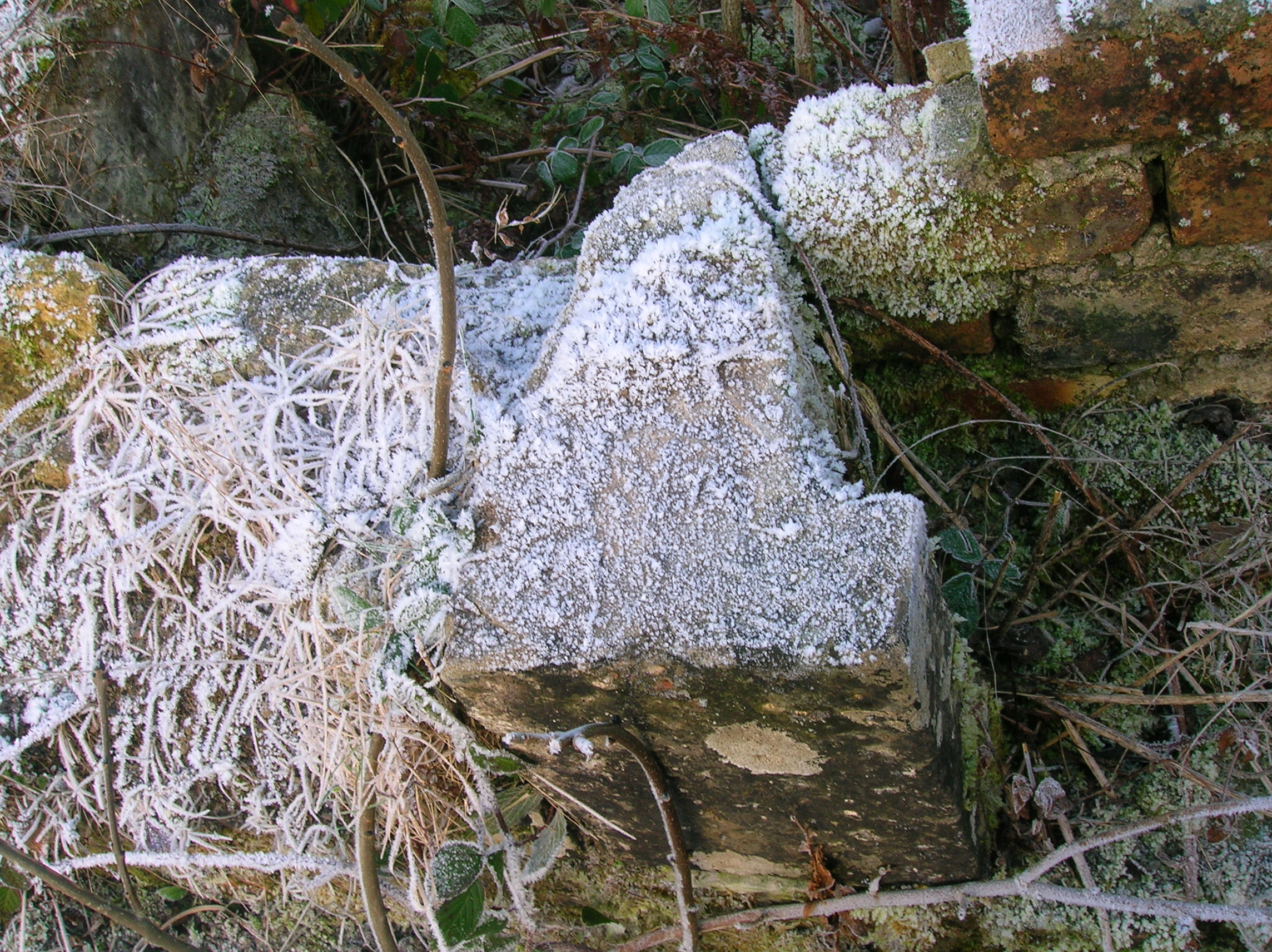
Detail of the high quality stonework on window facing towards Eglinton Country Park

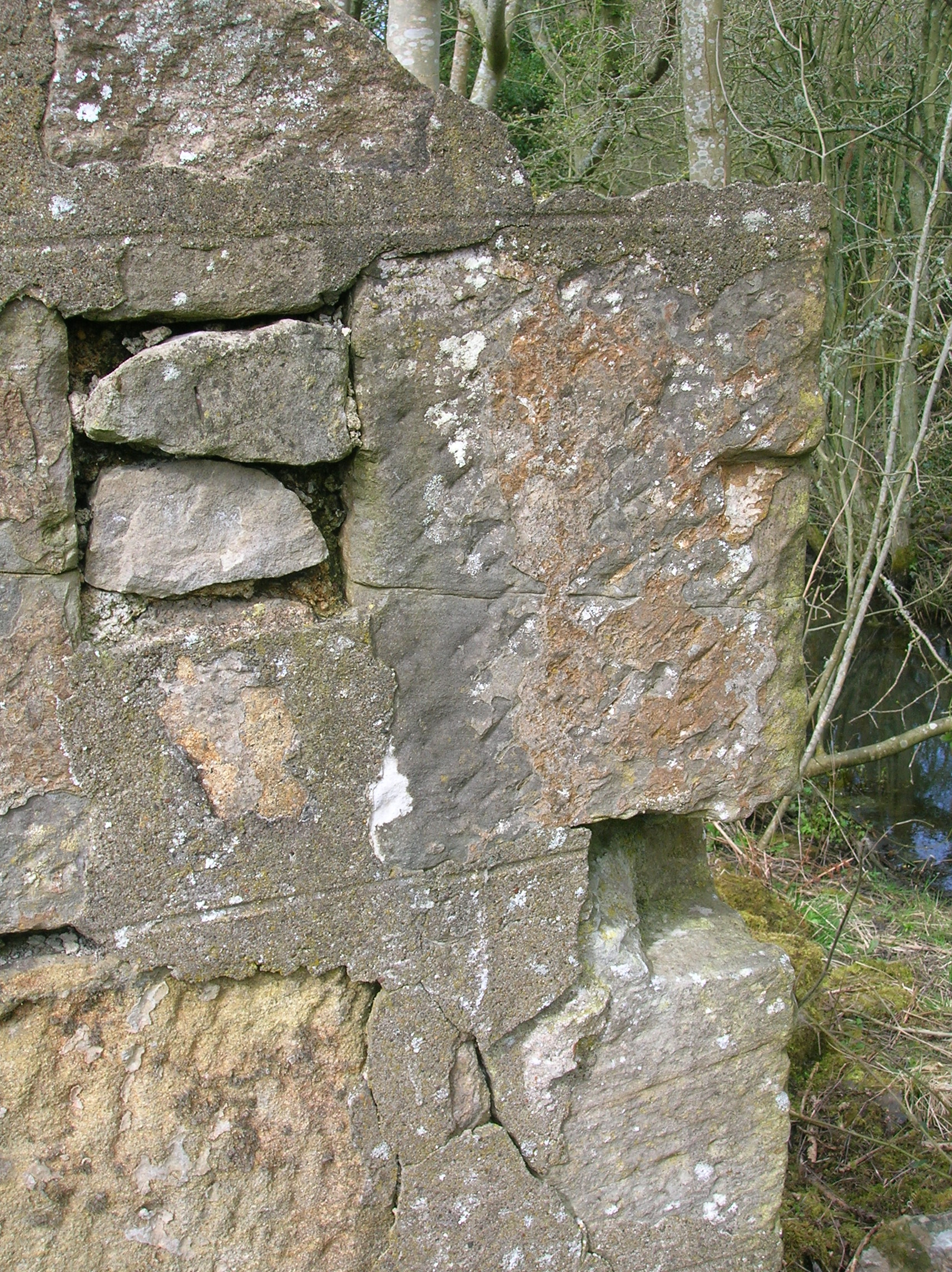
Re-used stones in the gable end wall

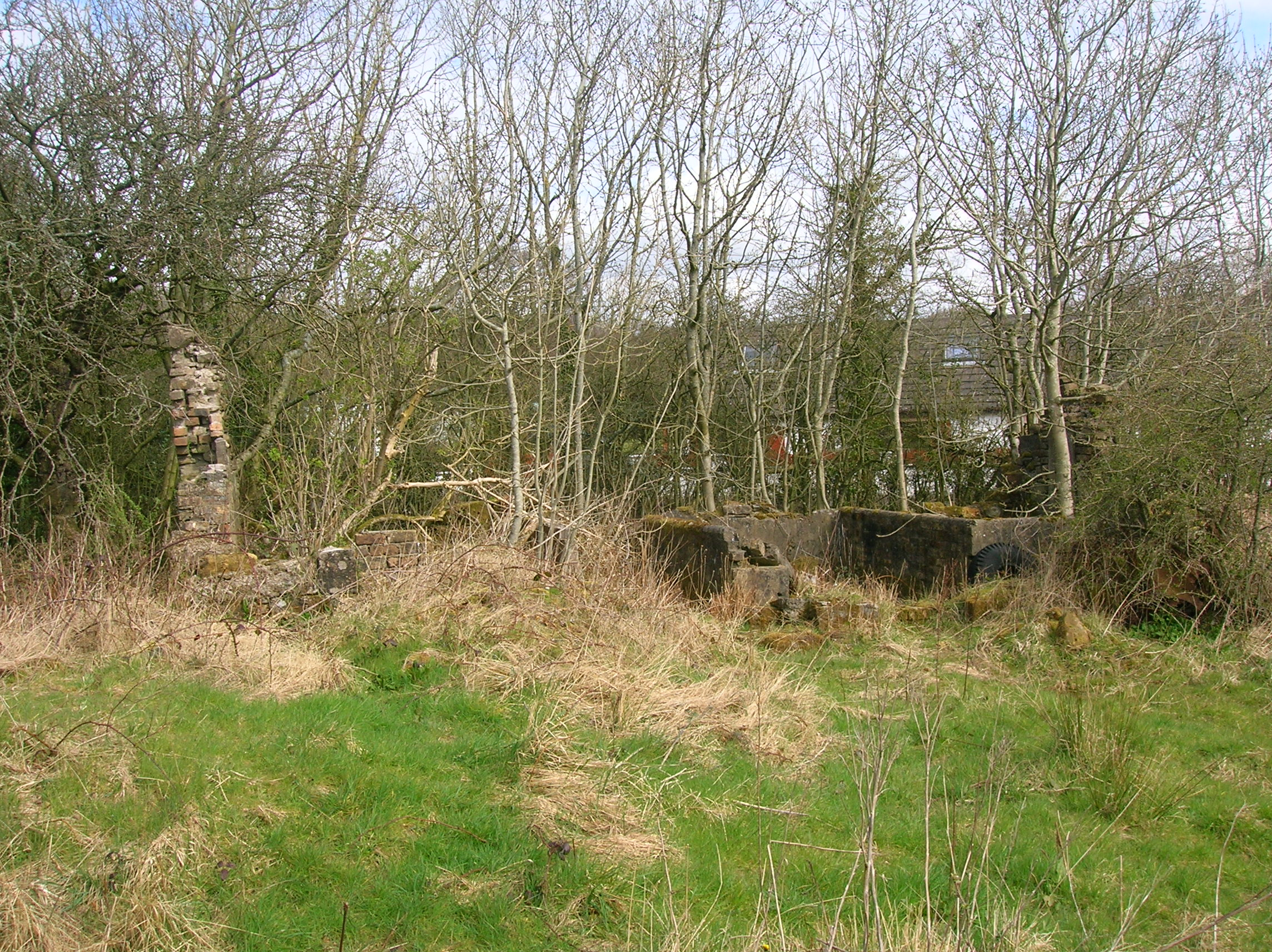
The cottage from the Sourlie branch trackbed

== The 1774 Toll Road ==
The Drucken or Drukken (drunken) Steps were stepping stones on the course of the old Toll Road which ran from the west end of Irvine through the Eglinton policies to Kilwinning via Milnburn or Millburn; crossing the Redburn near Knadgerhill.

The minutes of the Turnpike Trust of 27 May 1780 state that the road to the Dowra Coal Works had for more than 13 years been totally neglected, not one penny of Statute Money or repair of any kind have been expended. In the winter and during wet weather the road was impassable, even for travelling on horseback, nor could carriages of any kind pass along it.

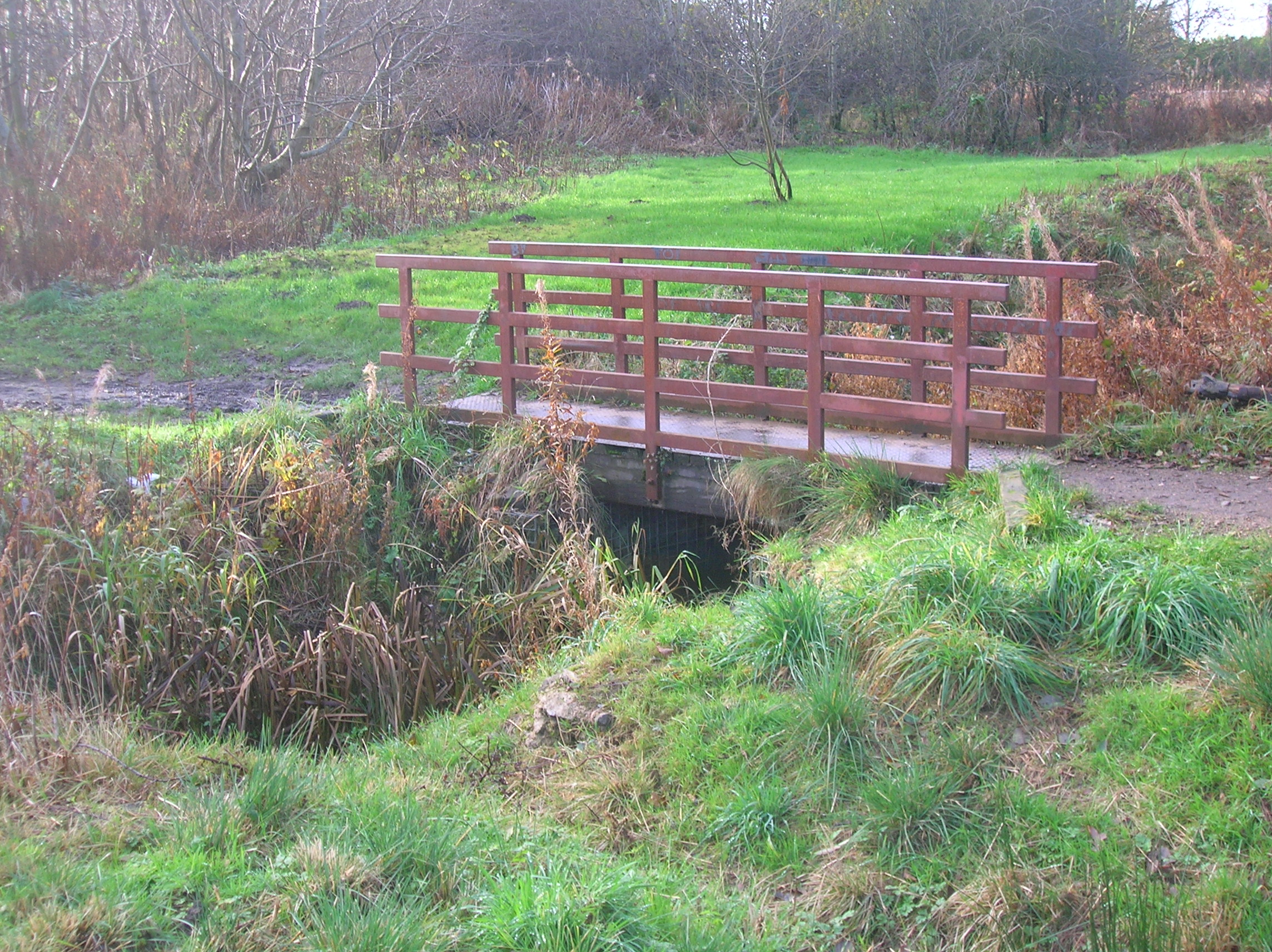
The site of the Drucken Steps on the 1774 Toll road to Milnburn via Hygenhouse

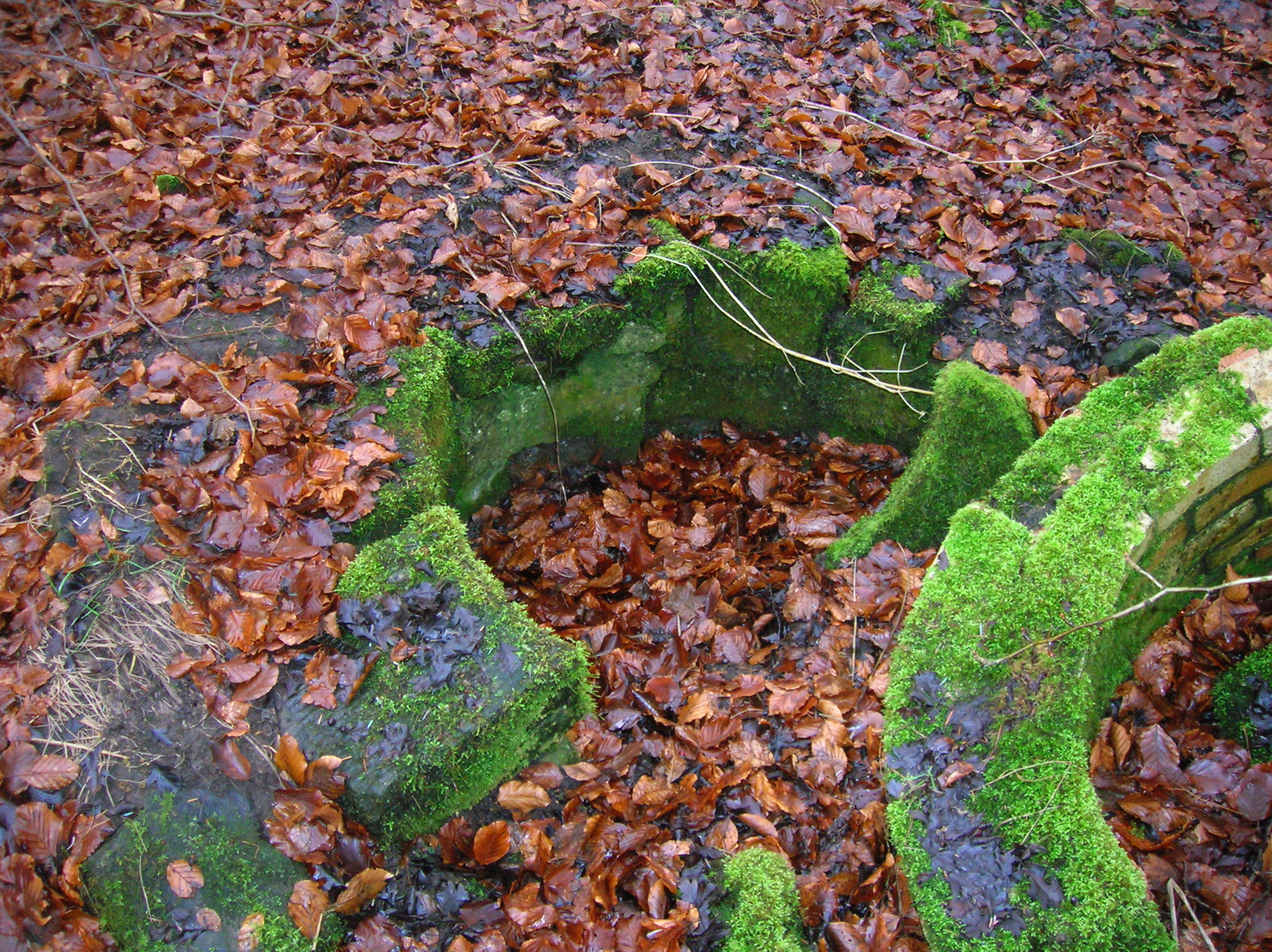
The old well at the Draughtburn gate. A gardener, William Mullin, once lived here.

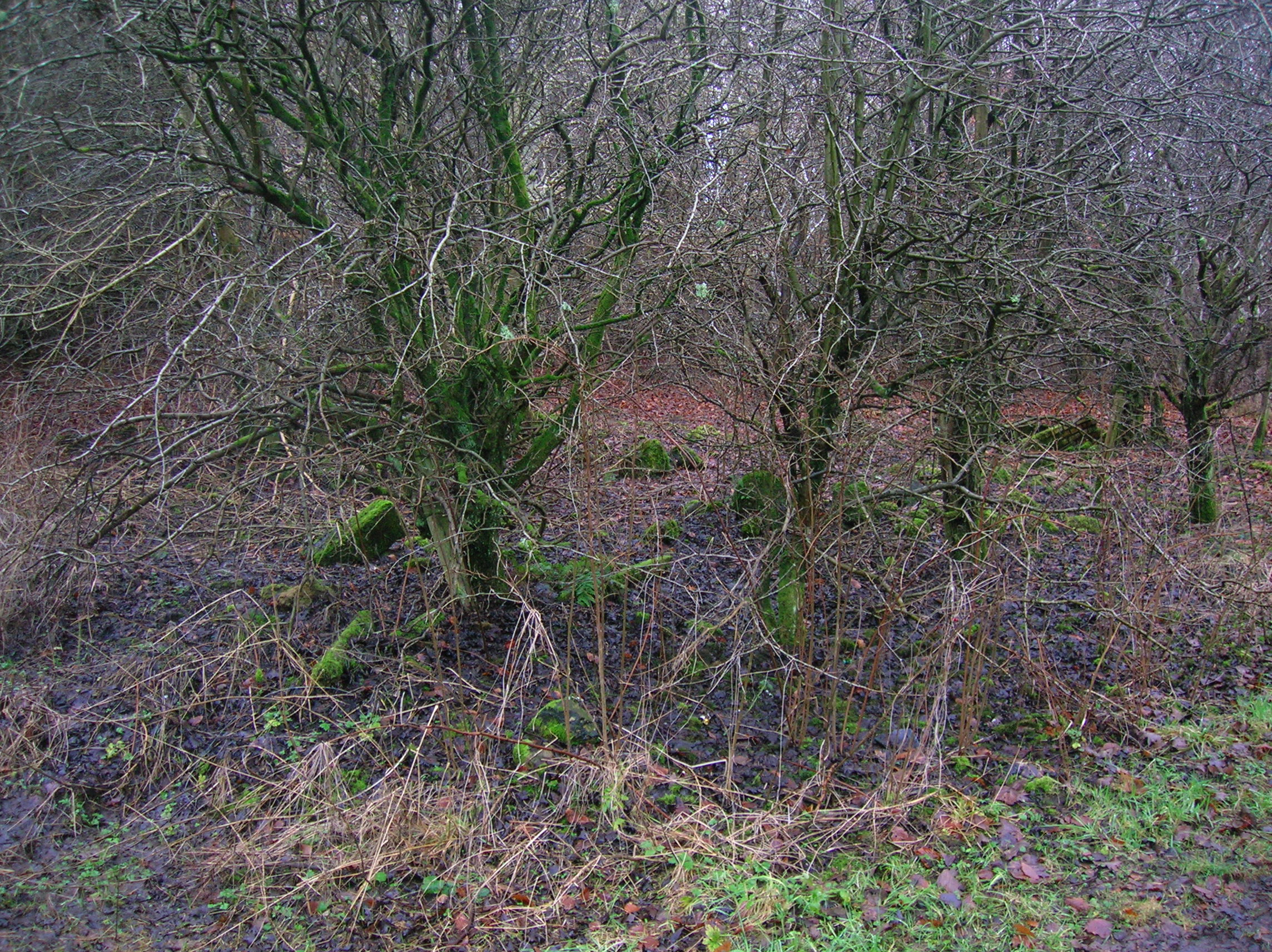
Ruins at the Draughtburn Gate

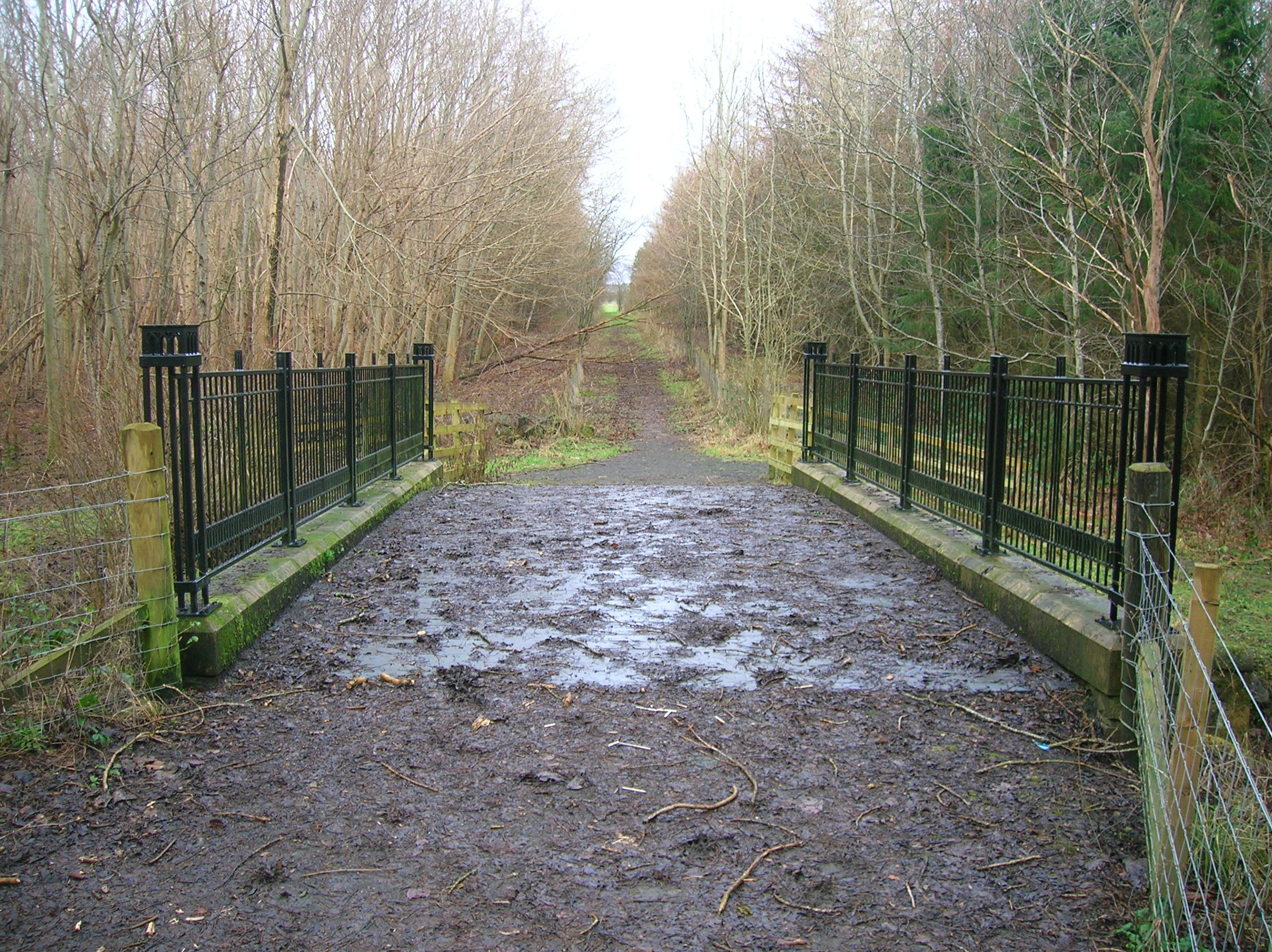
The course of the toll road from Daughtburn Bridge

=== Miner's Rows ===
A number of miner's houses once existed at nearby North Fergushill, a shown by the various OS maps of the late 20th century. Benslie itself was made up of 57 stone built miners houses, owned by A. Finnie and Son. Coalmasters. In 1913 the village was said to be 67 years old. The population was 318 in 1881. At first the houses only existed at the 'Square' and then later the village was extended towards the road which runs up passed the church. A number of coal pits were in the area as shown by the first edition OS map, one pit being close to the 'Millburn Cottage' opposite South Millburn. In 1937 most of the miner's rows were demolished and the miners were moved to the Dirrans.

=== The Hurry and coup ===
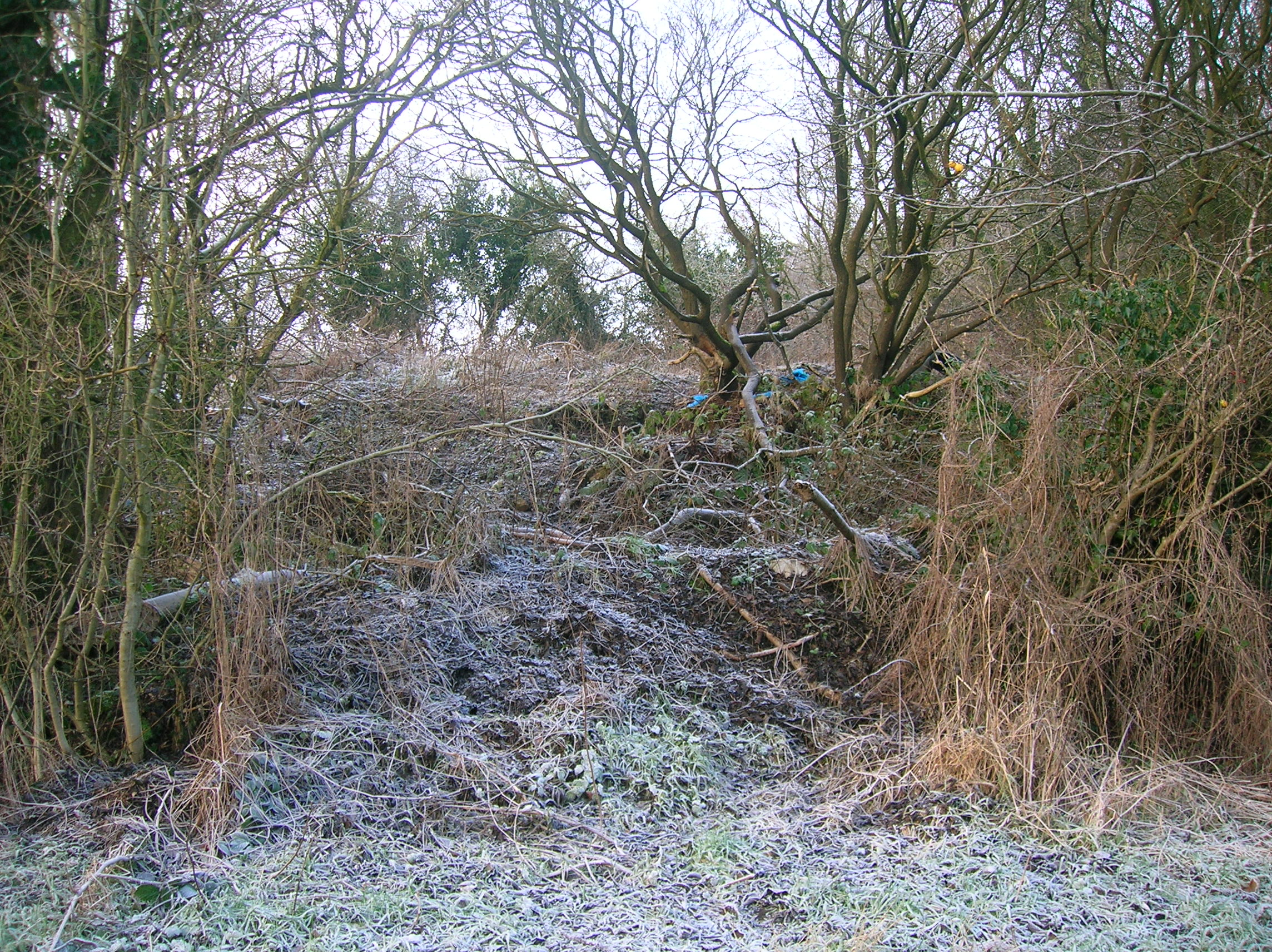
The old coup used by the Benslie miner's rows

The coup for the 'old' miner's rows or village was just to the right of the entrance to Millburn Drive and was excavated circa 2006 by enthusiasts who retrieved many bottles and other items from the 'heyday' of the miner's rows. The original 4 ft 6 in (1,370 mm) waggonway ran along one side of this coup and part of a stone fronted 'dock' or loading platform wall still stands, partly built with old stone railway sleepers. Much of the 'dock' stones has been robbed and it may have had walling on two sides originally with a lane on the western side running down to a siding on the standard gauge track. The structure may be related to the construction and resource requirements of the Eglinton Tournament of 1839 as it lies close to the tournament site and lay on the railway that ran from Ardrossan Harbour.

The name 'coup' may derive from the well known waggon of that name that was designed to tip its load. A good example is preserved at the National Museum of Rural Life.

=== Doura coal pits ===
Dr. Duguid states in the late 18th century that the Doura pits had not been worked since the time of Mary Queen of Scots (1542–1587), when they had supplied coal to the Palace of Holyrood and Edinburgh Castle. This is not as unlikely as it seems because the mining methods of the time had exhausted the available coal stocks and that their existed an "exhorbitant dearth and scantness of fewale within the Realme." He was the doctor for the pit and recalls that when the pit was drained, William Ralston, the ganger, found the old workmen's tools and their bones at the coal face.

In Duguid's time another disaster took place after heavy frosts had loosened the pit soil and the pit supports gave way. Pate Brogildy from the Redboiler survived, however he later had his arm ripped off at the shoulder blade by the flywheel of the pit steam engine. He survived as the twisting motion of the 'amputation' had sealed the arteries. Willie Forgisal (Fergushill?) of Torranyard had his leg amputated above the knee. James Jamphrey from Corsehill was killed instantly.

The Statistical Account records that the coals at Doura were ell and stone-coals. Easter Doura mine employed 12–16 colliers and was owned by Lord Lisle and was leased by him for £140 per annum in the 18th century.

== Benslie wood and the Baroque deer park or garden ==
This 'Baroque' or 'Celtic Cross' feature is what is now known as Benslie Wood, part of the extensive Eglinton Castle historic landscape, located outside of the formal 'Pleasure Gardens' on Benslie farm. Much of this landscape feature's outline survives except on the Benslie village side of the present wood, with the present road cutting through the extreme edge of the feature. The 'outline' is formed from linear earth banks which contain a quantity of stone and shows signs of being originally planted up with beech and sycamore trees as evidenced from the remains of old tree stumps or surviving old tree specimens. With no evidence of a boundary wall, it is possible that a pale existed to make the enclosure stockproof. The linear bank is mostly curved, except for short sections where 'right angle' bends were required to form the desired 'baroque' shape. It may have had a pale or fence on top of it to make it stockproof, in addition to the boundary ditch.

Etymology
The meaning of Benslie is most likely to be the shelter or grassland / lea (Lee) on the hill (Ben).

Skill would have been necessary to accurately lay out this complex shape. A cross-shape and peripheral 'path' network appears to have been created of which no definite sign remains. The extensive earth movements associated with the 'rig and furrow' works appear to pre-date the feature, the same works being visible in the surrounding fields as well. The position of the older holly trees is suggestive of their being in lines as if they are the remains of an internal 'hedge' planting. These old holly trees were a feature of the wood as far back as the 1930s. Oliver Rackham has shown that holly trees can live for three to four hundred years and therefore the old hollies could date from 1747. A few show clear signs of long predating the birch trees, their present stunted growth only occurring once the birch trees were mature and cast significant shade. Holly is fairly resistant to cattle and deer, indeed it was deliberately planted because its foliage was cut as iron rations for deer and other stock in winter.

The 1747 Roy's map is a 'snapshot' in time and does not necessarily represent the completed feature. It does not appear as an extension of the extensive Eglinton 'pleasure gardens', however it does appear to align with the large rond-point still known as 'The Circle'. As a feature it is unlikely that the entire 'baroque' shape could be seen from any nearby location, but it may have been discernible from the upper areas of the castle. The original feature appears to have had open launds, delineated by sycamore and beech planting on the outer boundary and possibly the aforementioned holly planting in the interior.

In 1775 Andrew Armstrong's, A new map of Ayrshire... shows a circular woodland on the borders of the Doura estate, open apart from what appears to be a single tree in its centre.

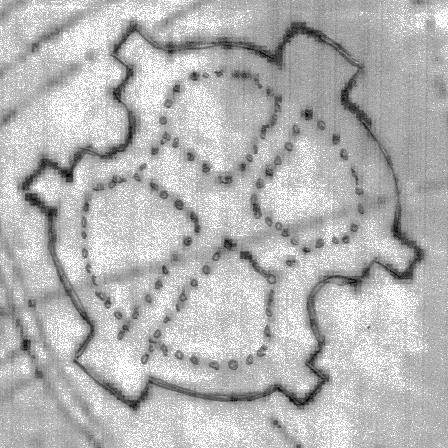
The appearance of the landscape feature in 1747

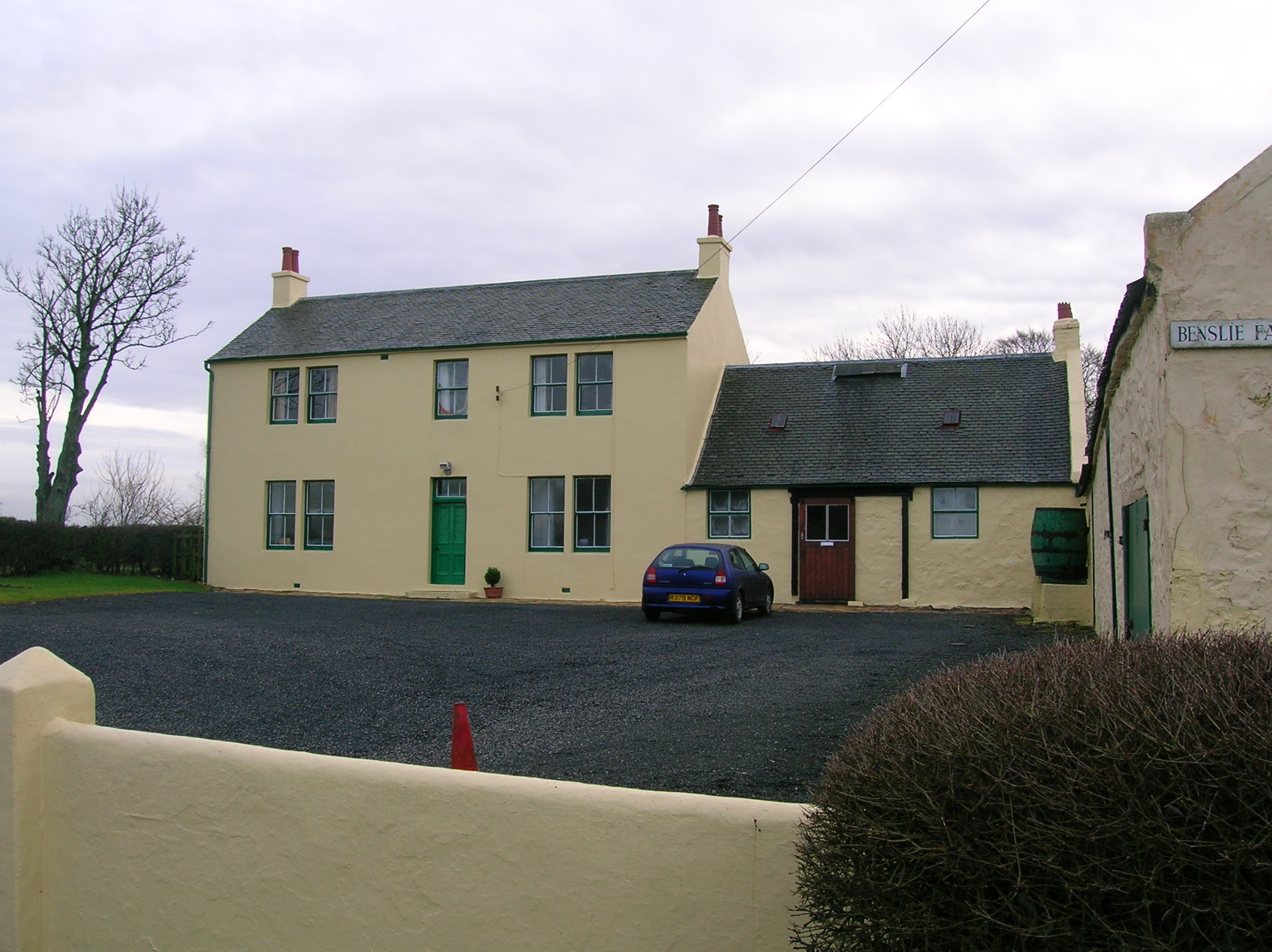
Benslie Fauld farm

The name 'fauld' may hold a clue to the purpose or use of this landscape feature as this is Scots for an area manured by sheep, cattle or possibly deer. At this time the main estate 'pleasure gardens' did not include a deer park.

The present wood is largely composed of silver birch trees which have grown naturally. The wood was felled in the 1940s by a foundry owner in Kilwinning and the ground was regularly burned until about forty years ago to keep it clear of brambles, trees, etc. Downy birch, oak, sycamore and willow are also present. An unusually predominant presence of holly trees, especially old holly trees, has already been remarked upon and may reflect a feature of the planting of the original 'Baroque' feature.

The 'Baroque' or 'Celtic cross' layout is said to be similar to that which existed at the Optagon Park, Alloa Estate, Clackmannanshire; which in turn was modelled after the Dutch taste and based upon Hampton Court, the favourite home of King William; a Dutchman. It is possible that this area was incomplete when mapped by Roy in the 1750s.

Mr. Robert McGill of North Millburn Farm recalls that local lore has it that after a 'plague' in the 19th century a large number of people from the local miner's rows were buried in a mass grave in Benslie Wood. Another local tradition is that the bodies were buried in the nether fields of South Millburn, close to the old Doura coal pit.

The wood was created on the lands of the old Benslie farm, however a small wood existed before and a remnant of this wood survived until recently in the area now occupied by Benslie House and Kinnouli. John Thomson's Atlas of Scotland, 1832, shows Benslie Wood, bisected by a road, but without the characteristic shape.

=== Benslie Fauld farm ===
A tale is told of a visit by a local character, Daft Wull Speir, to Benslie Fauld. Wullie was given a bowl of brose by the farmer's wife and whilst saying grace he decided that the servant girl was being less than generous with the milk, so he said between his clasped fingers, Ay, noo, Jean, juist pour't a' on your wa's!

=== Views of the 'Baroque Deer park' at Benslie Wood ===
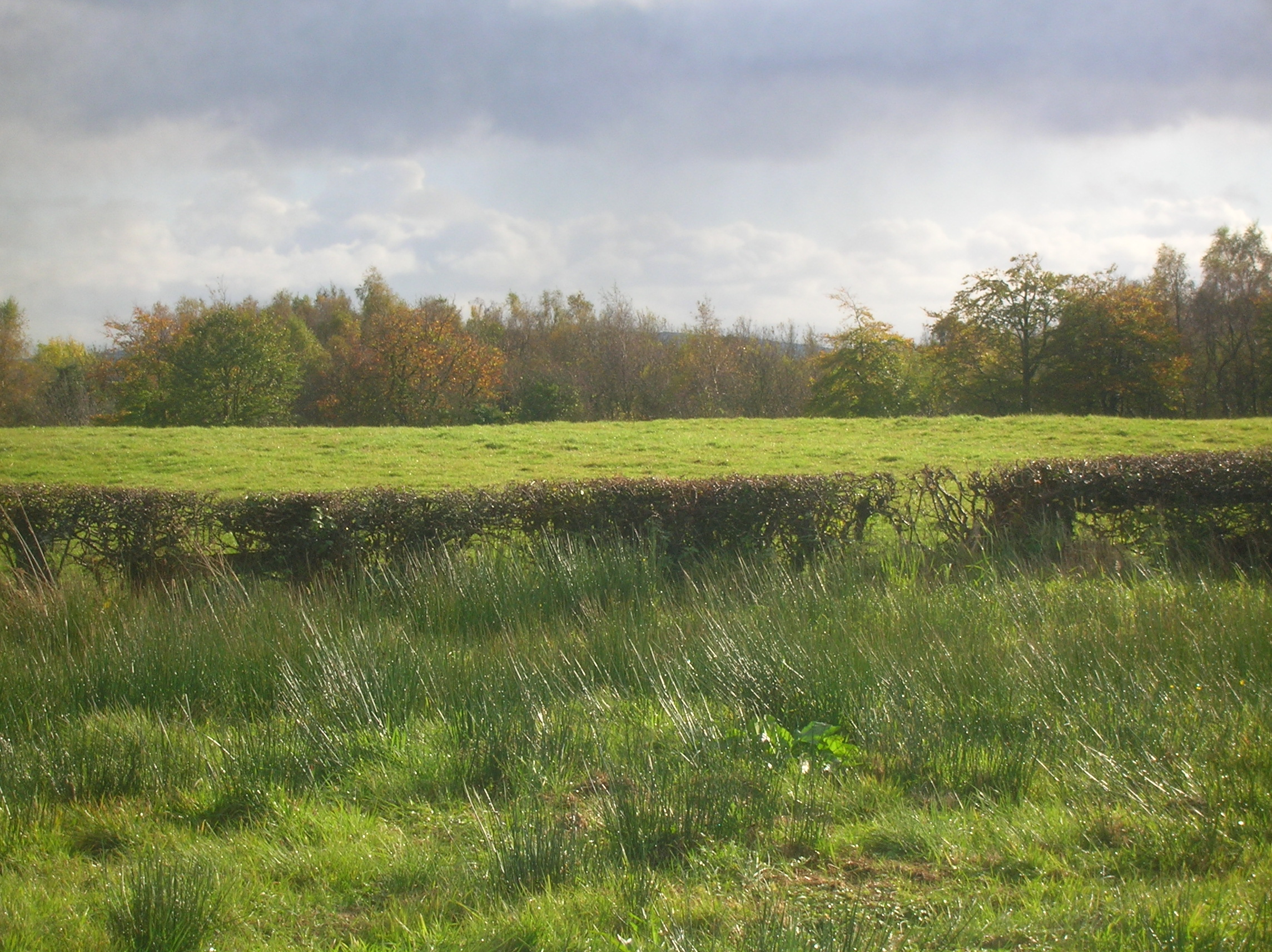
Benslie wood on the site of the old Baroque feature

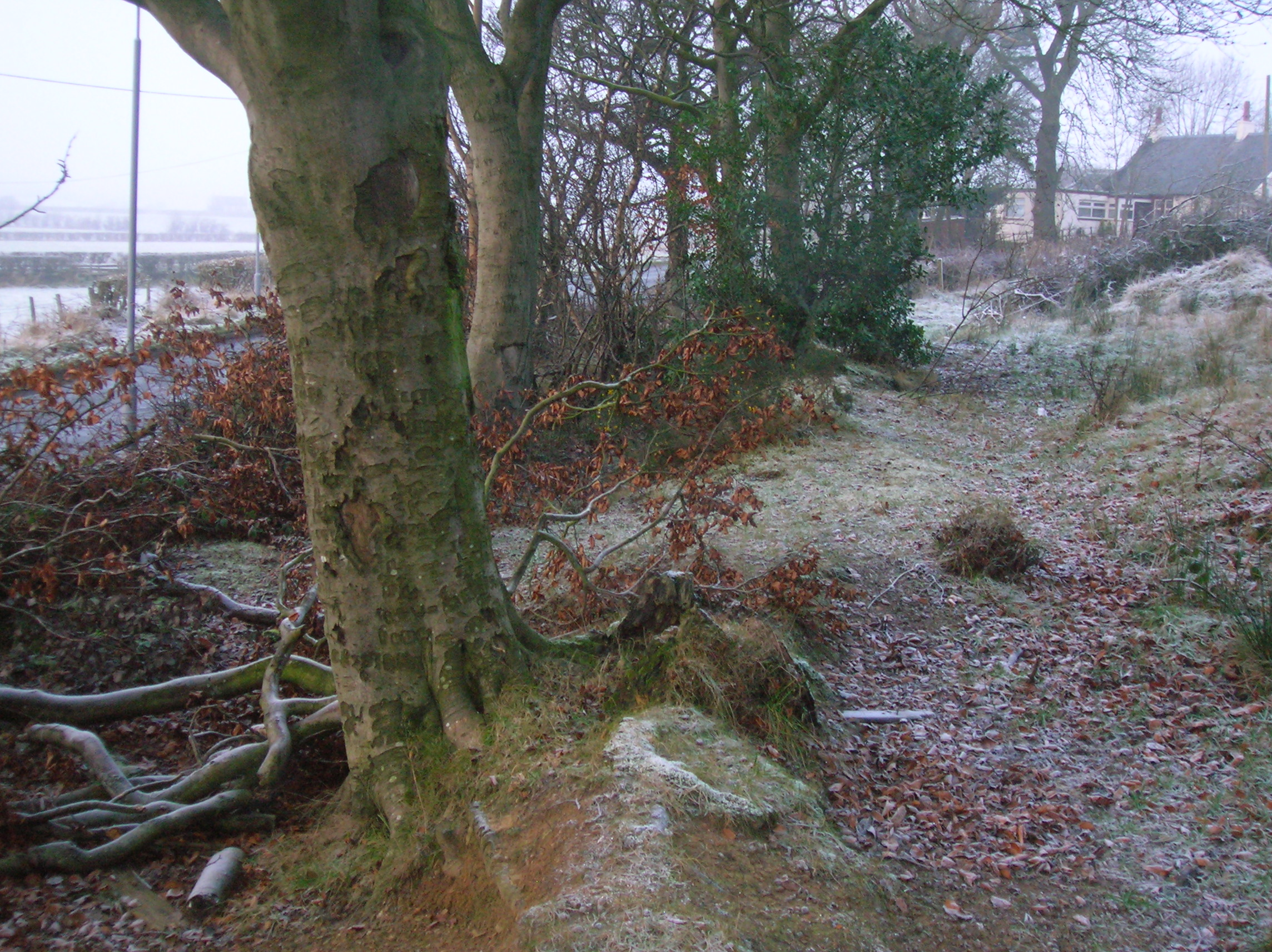
The 'park' outline where it diverges from the hedge bordering Fergushill Road

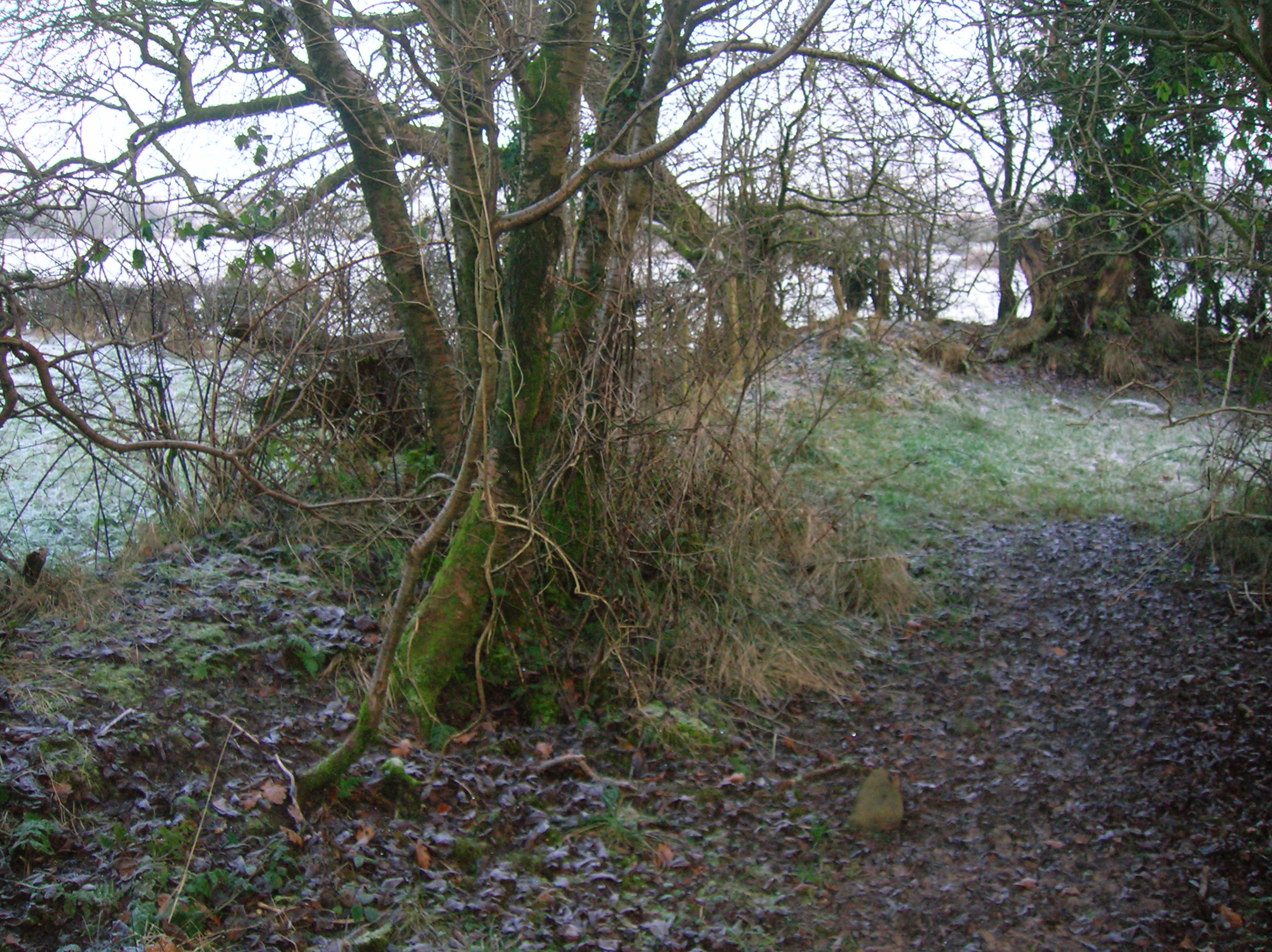
A 'right angle' turn on the 'Doura' side of the wood

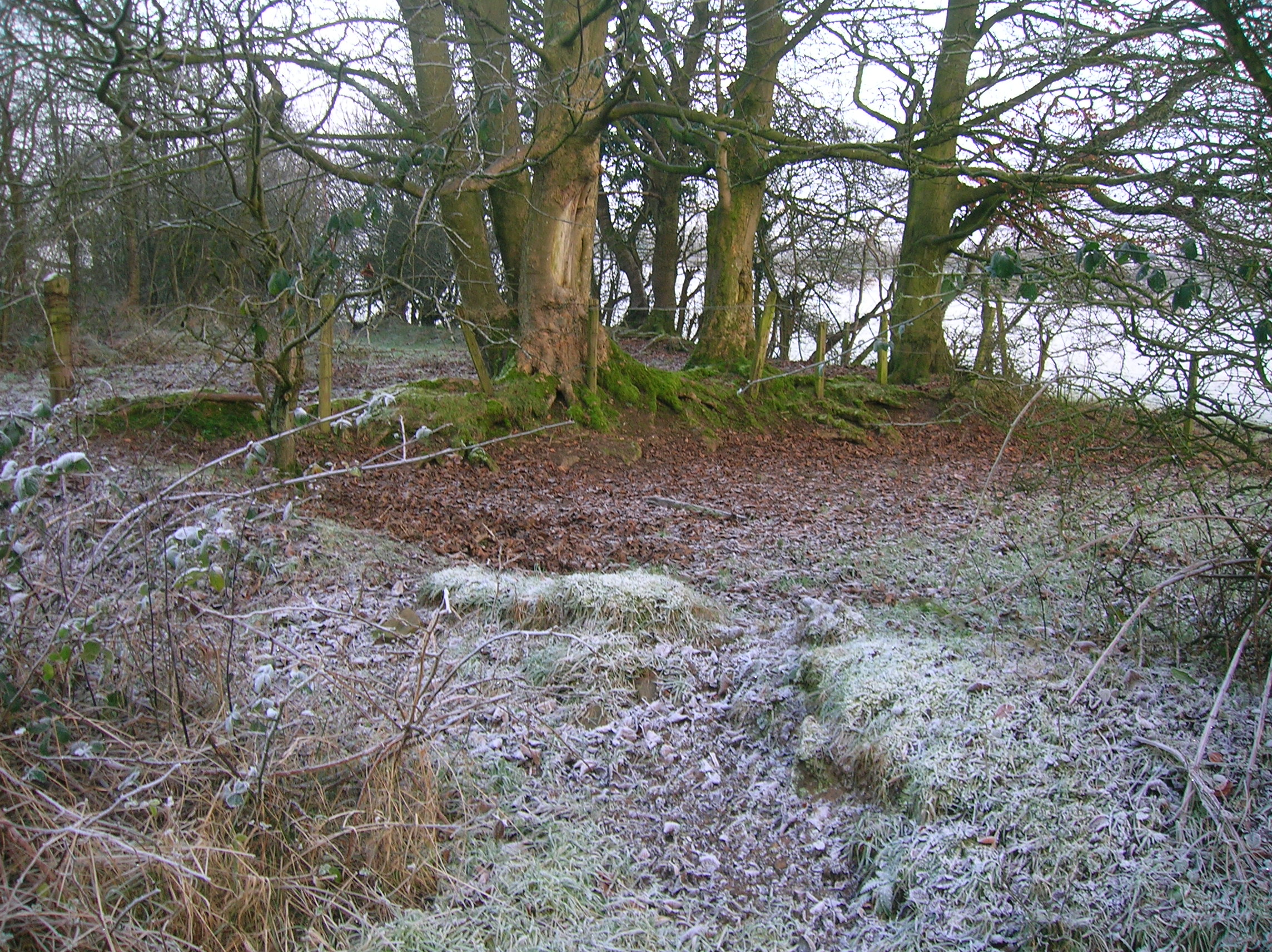
A double 'right angle' turn on the 'Doura' side of the wood

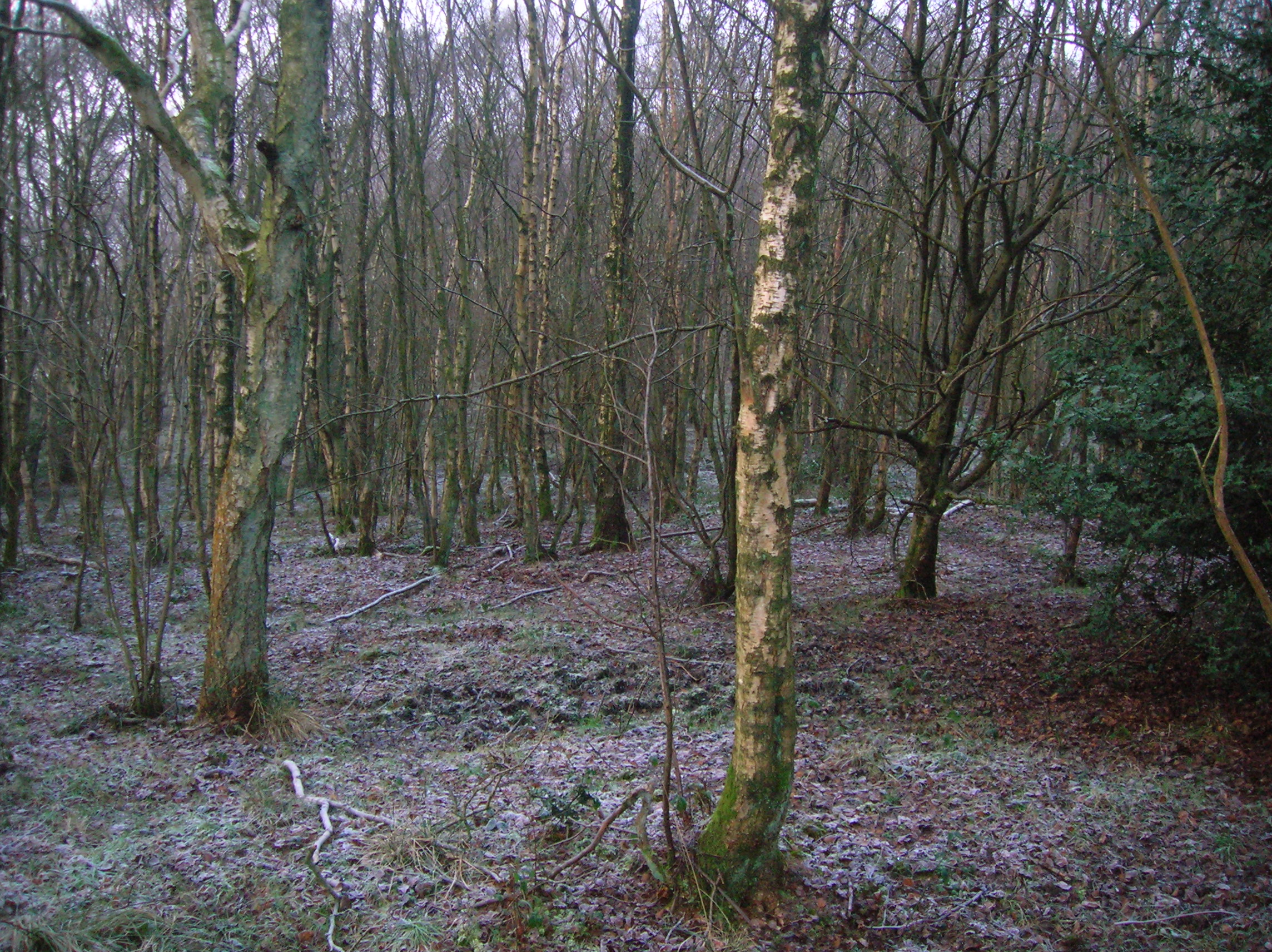
A view in the wood with birch and holly on the well-preserved rigs and furrows

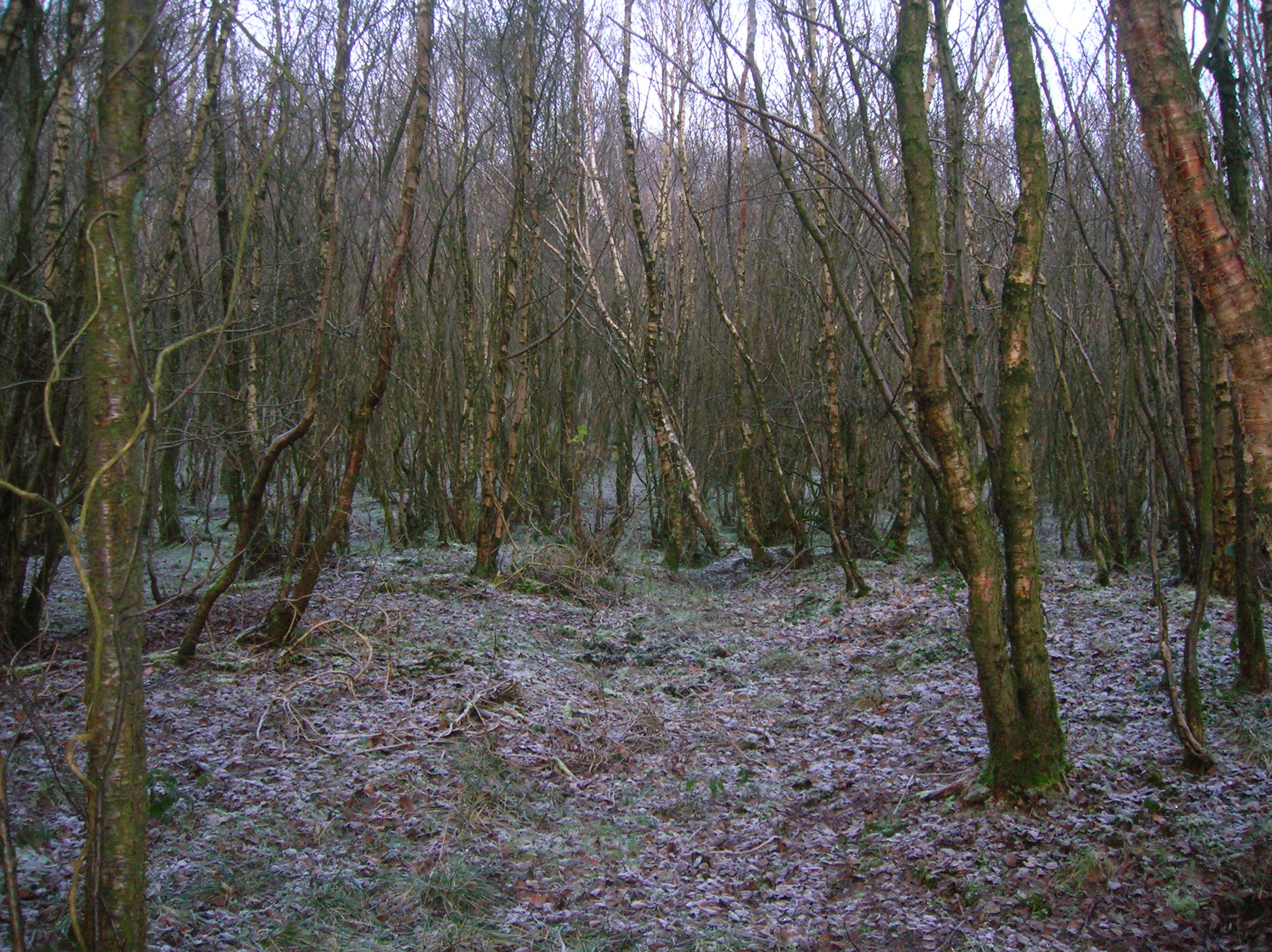
A view of the 'rig & furrow' style drainage and the dominant planted birch composition of the woodland

=== The Benslie wood mound ===
A Moot hill usually existed within each barony in feudal times, such as the surviving 'Court Hill' near Beith and the now destroyed example at Greenhills near Barmill in the Barony of Giffen. Fergushill was a barony, as was Montgreenan. It is not known where the moot hills were for these. A fair sized mound is shown on several OS maps as existing within Benslie Wood close behind Wood Neuk cottage and therefore to the rear of the modern houses facing onto the road to Montgreenan.

The purpose of this mound is unknown, however it would have been a prominent feature if the hill was not afforested and it could have served as the moot hill for the barony or it may be a plausible candidate for the site of the old chapel.

An irregularly shaped raised area of ground runs down from near Benslie Fauld farm into the garden of Wood Neuk.

== Fergushill church ==
Fergushill church in Benslie was built to serve the local rural and mining communities of Doura, Fergushill, and Montgreenan. It was consecrated on Sunday, 3 November 1879 and the first minister was then Rev. William McAlpine. It got its name from the Fergushill Mission which was based at Fergushill school which had closed in 1950. The old school master's house (See photograph) is still in existence at the junction of the road to Seven Acres Mill. The church had its spire blown down in a gale in 1968, also damaging the roof; the building was repaired in 1969. The Church of Scotland Presbytery of Ardrossan decided to close the church in June 2009; over a hundred people attended the final Sunday service.

The manse, later named 'Janburrow' is now a private house and stands at the entrance to the old Montgreenan railway station drive. Janbarrow first belonged to Mr. James Watson, a local joiner and was purchased by the G&SWR for its agent at Montgreenan station in 1884 at the cost of £255. The house was purchased from the railway by Mr. Currie of Hurlford and later purchased by the church in 1906 when an extra bay was added. Opposite is Burnbrae cottage, built as the Montgreenan Estate factor's house in 1846. 'Janburrow' is derived from the lady named Janet who came from Burrowland farm and lived in the old manse for many years after a Mrs Reid, the previous owner, had died.

=== Fergushill church and manse ===
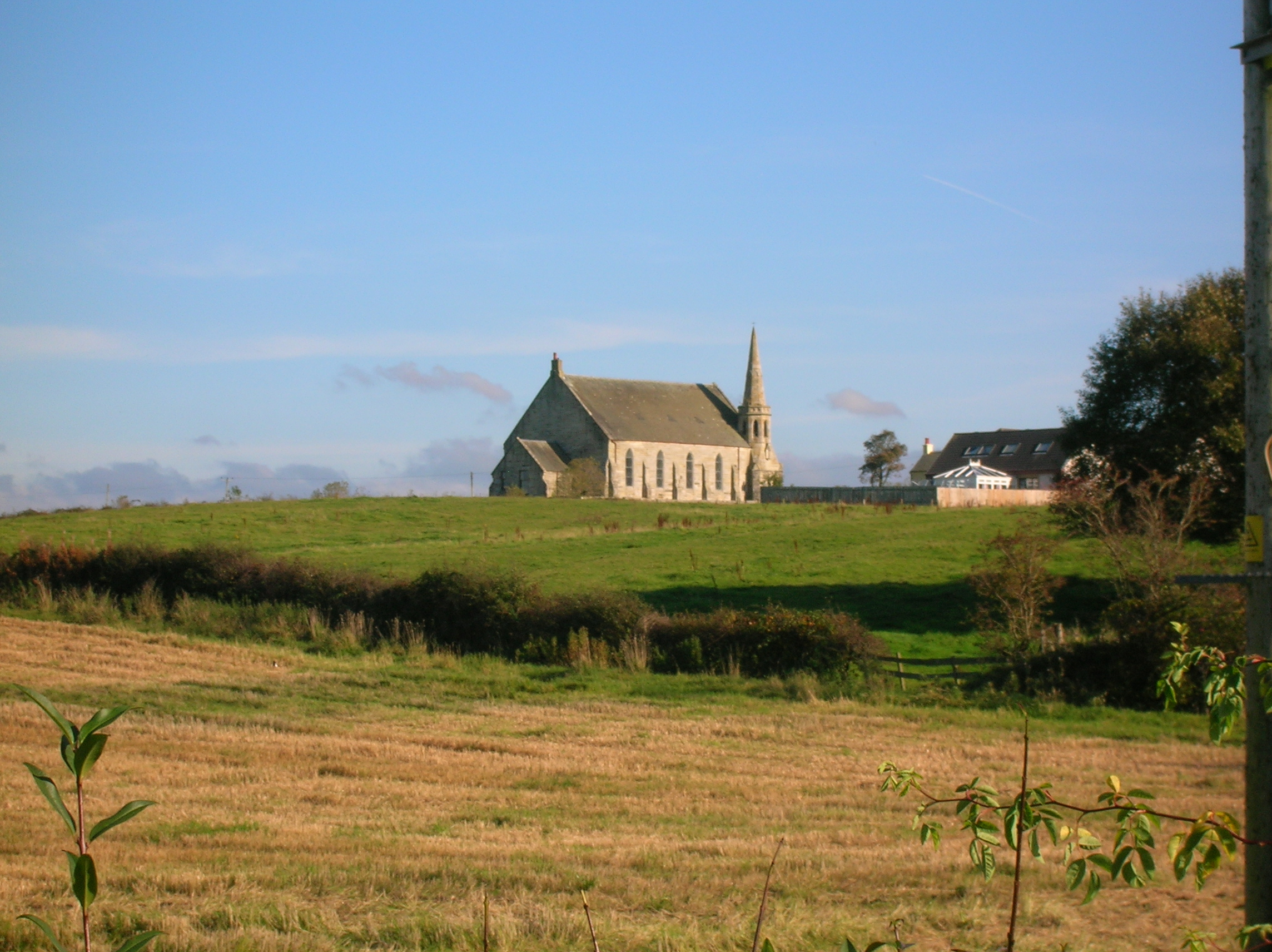
Fergushill church at Benslie

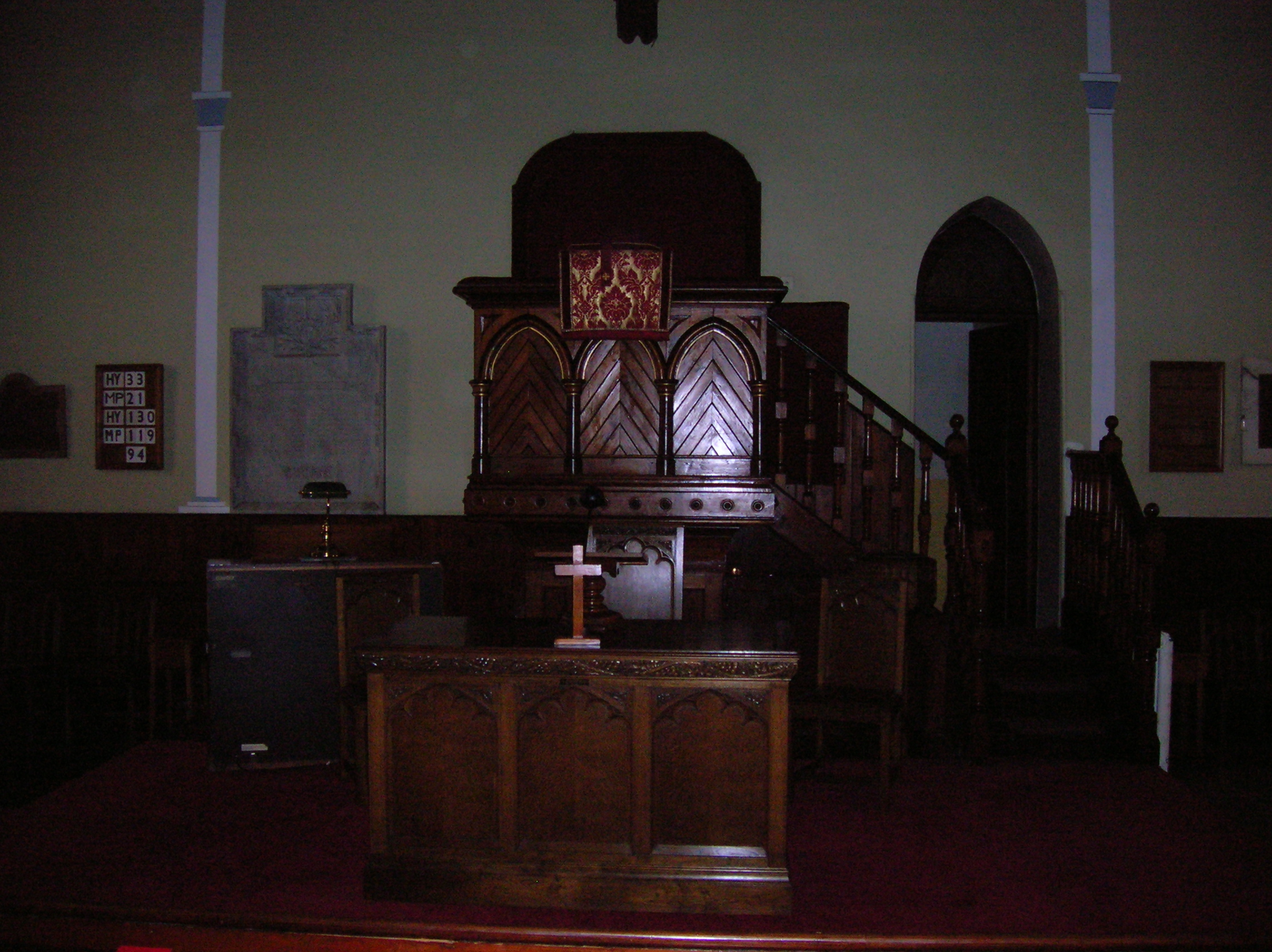
The interior

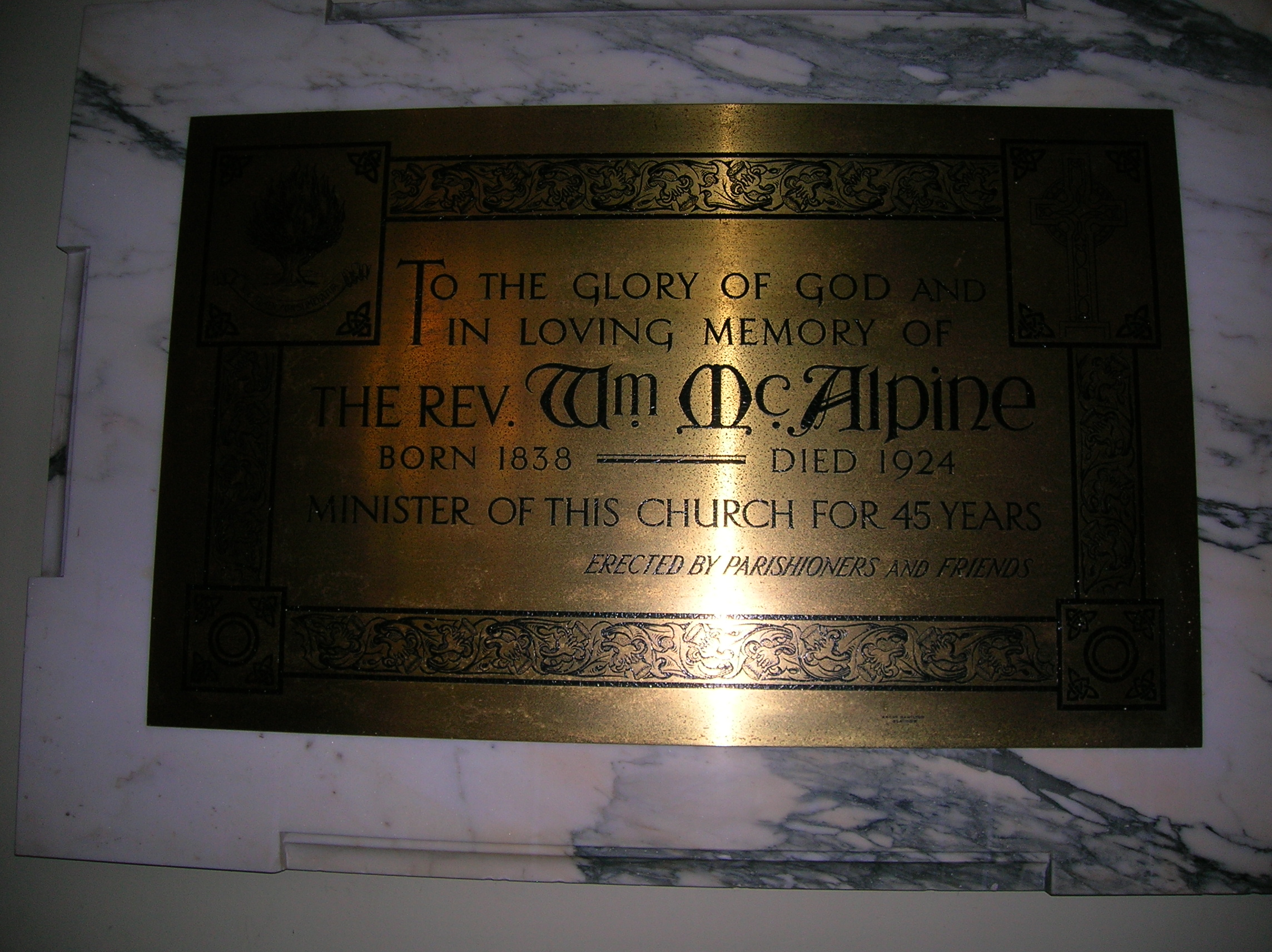
Memorial to William MacAlpin

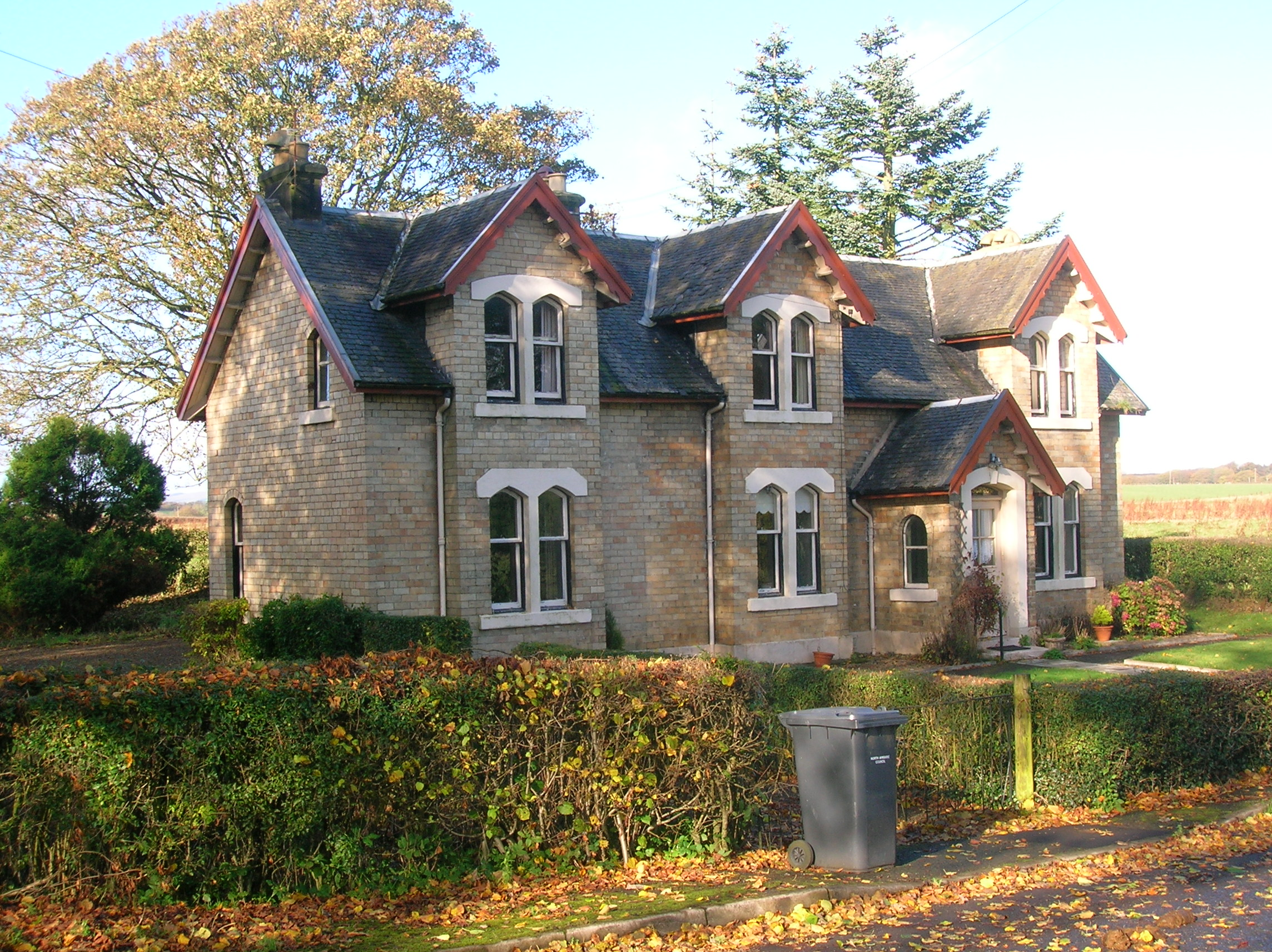
Janburrow, Fergushill church's old manse and previously the G&SWR company agent's office near Montgreenan

== Doura Hall ==
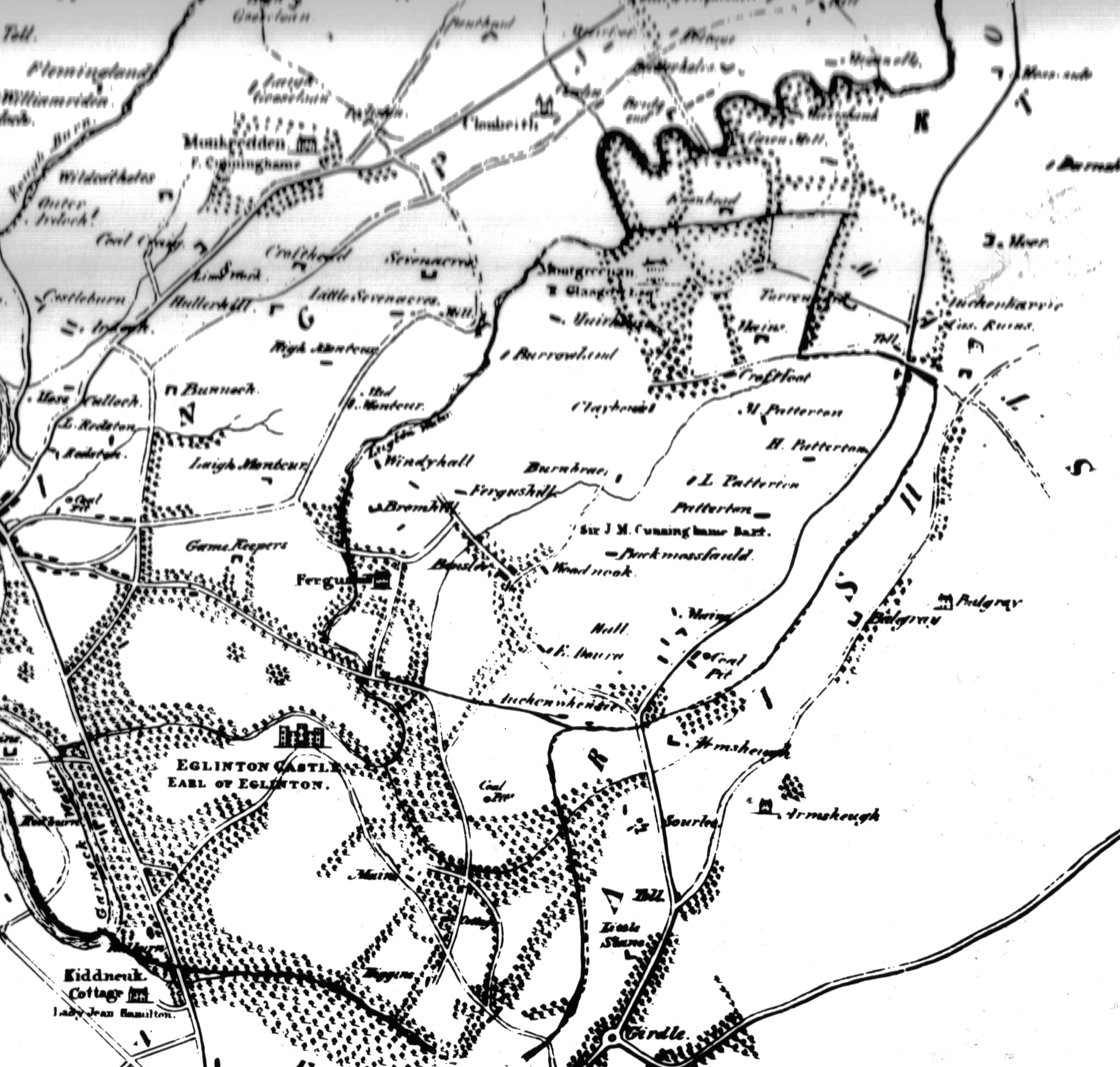
Aitken's 1823 map showing the position of Doura, Benslie, etc.

Doura Hall was a 17th-century building located on the road up to Doura Mains farm. It had been the intention of the Lairds of Corsehill to build a new house at the 'Dowrie' in the Barony of Dowra, however nothing was done, but plans of the proposed buildings have survived. It was lived in by Sir Walter Montgomerie-Cunninghame in the 1780s after he lost Lainshaw House. James Boswell described it as a poor building. It was demolished in the 19th century and appeared on the 1910 25-inch-to-the-mile (1:2534.4) OS map. A Dovecote hill and orchard brae are further reminders of this estate, owned by the Cunninghames of Corsehill. South Millburn is marked as East Doura on the 1910 OS map. A smithy was located at the Doura hamlet in the late 18th century.

In 1691 the Hearth Tax records show that the hall had six hearths and was occupied by Lady Corshill. The barony had sixteen other dwellings.

In 1775 Andrew Armstrong's, A new map of Ayrshire... shows the 'Dowrey' mansion house and wooded policies of Doura. John Ainslie's 1821 Map of the Southern Part of Scotland uses the name 'Dourey'.

== Micro history, traditions and wildlife ==
Plagues were an occurrence in the 18th and 19th-centuries with outbreaks of small pox in 1791, cholera in 1832 and scarlet fever in 1837. Sentinels were placed at points on the roads to stop anyone entering or leaving the effected areas.

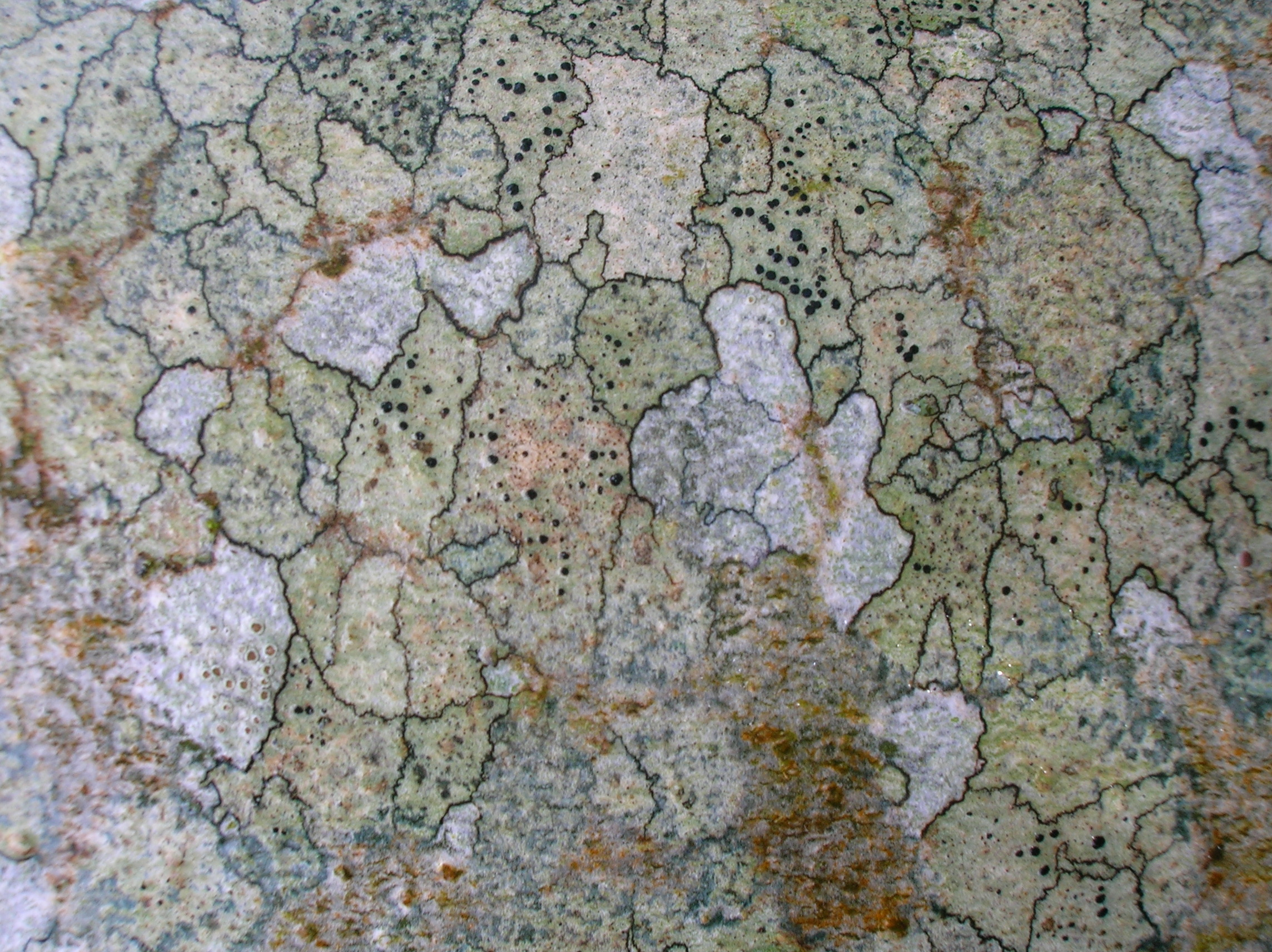
Lichens on ash tree bark

The name 'Benslie' exists as a surname. It is not known if any connection exists with the village.

The British Telecom 2006/7 'Phone Book' has Benslie with the spelling 'Bensley' and even Bensley Cottage [sic] is recorded as being in Montgreenan.

Houses existed at the end of Millburn Drive and mid-way along. On the left when facing Millburn Lodge; where it joins Fergushill Road, was the railway hut used by the railway employee who controlled the level crossing gates which permitted freight trains to cross the drive.

A rare visitor, the ivory gull, was photographed at Laigh Patterton Farm, in January 2007.

== See also ==
- Eglinton Country Park
- Fergushill
- Montgreenan railway station
- Industry and the Eglinton Castle estate
- Lands of Doura

== Sources ==
- Anstruther, Ian (1963). "The Knight and the Umbrella: An Account of the Eglinton Tournament — 1839", London: Geoffrey Bles Ltd.
- Davis, Michael C. (1991). The Castles and Mansions of Ayrshire. Ardrishaig: Spindrift Press.
- Eglinton archive, Eglinton Country Park.
- Essery, Bob (2007). Railway Signalling and Track Plans. Hersham: Ian Allan. ISBN 0-7110-3215-7.
- Groome, Francis H. (1903). Ordnance Gazetteer of Scotland. London: Caxton.
- Hall, Derek (2006). Scottish Monastic Landscapes. Stroud: Tempus. ISBN 0-7524-4012-8.
- Hawksworth, Chris. (2008-9). Montgreenan Station, Sou'West Journal. 2008–2009. No. 40.
- Hawksworth, Chris. (2013). The Doura Branch of the Ardrossan and Johnston Railway. The 'Sou' West' Newsletter. G&SWR Association.
- James Ness papers. North Ayrshire Local & family history Centre, Irvine.
- Ker, Rev. William Lee (1900). Kilwinnning. Kilwinning: A. W. Cross.
- Lewin, Henry Grote (1925). Early British Railways. A short history of their origin & development 1801–1844. London: The Locomotive Publishing Co Ltd. OCLC 11064369.
- Lindsay, David M.E. Register of Stations, Routes, and Lines. G&SWR Association.
- McClure, David (1994). Tolls and Tacksmen. Ayr Arch & Nat Hist Soc. Ayrshire Monograph No. 13.
- McGill, Janet (2009). Auchenwinsey Farm, Irvine, North Ayrshire, Scotland.
- Ness, James A. (1969–70). Landmarks of Kilwynnyng. Privately produced.
- Rackham, Oliver (1976). Trees and Woodland in the British Landscape. Pub. J. M. Dent & Sons Ltd. ISBN 0-460-04183-5.
- Ransom, P. J. G. (1990). The Victorian Railway and How it Evolved. London: Heinemann. ISBN 0-434-98083-8.
- Robertson, William (1889). Historical Tales and Legends of Ayrshire Vol. II. London: Hamilton, Adams & Co.
- Roscoe, Thomas (1839). The London and Birmingham Railway, London: Charles Lilt.
- Service, John (1887). The Life & Recollections of Doctor Duguid of Kilwinning. Young J. Pentland.
- Service, John (1913). The Memorables of Robin Cummell. Paisley: Alexander Gardiner.
- Strawhorn, John (1985). The History of Irvine. Pub. John Donald. ISBN 0-85976-140-1.
- Urquhart, Robert H. et al. (1998). The Hearth Tax for Ayrshire 1691. Ayrshire Records Series V.1. Ayr: Ayr Fed Hist Soc ISBN 0-9532055-0-9.
- Whishaw, Francis (Reprinted and republished 1969) [1840]. The Railways of Great Britain and Ireland practically described and illustrated (3rd ed.). Newton Abbott: David & Charles (1842 edition - London: John Weale). ISBN 0-7153-4786-1.
